= History of Baton Rouge, Louisiana =

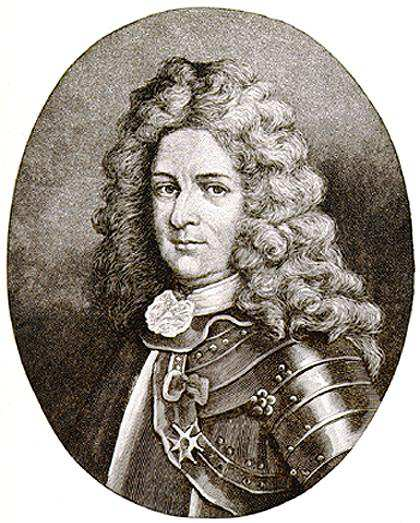
Pierre Le Moyne, Sieur d'Iberville provided Baton Rouge as well as Lakes Pontchartrain and Maurepas with their current names.

The foundation of Baton Rouge, Louisiana, dates to 1721, at the site of a bâton rouge or "red stick" Muscogee boundary marker. It became the state capital of Louisiana in 1849.

== Prehistory ==
Human habitation in the Baton Rouge area has been dated to about 8000 BC based on evidence found along the Mississippi, Comite, and Amite rivers. Earthwork mounds were built by hunter-gatherer societies in the Middle Archaic period, from roughly the 4th millennium BC. Proto-Muskogean divided into its daughter languages by about 1000 BC; a cultural boundary between either side of Mobile Bay and the Black Warrior River begins to appear between about 1200 BC and 500 BC, the Middle "Gulf Formational Stage". Eastern Muskogean began to diversify internally in the first half of the 1st millennium AD. The early Muskogean nations were the bearers of the Mississippian culture which formed around AD 800. By the time the Spanish made their first forays inland from the shores of the Gulf of Mexico in the early 16th century, many political centers of the Mississippians were already in decline, or abandoned, the region at the time presenting as a collection of moderately-sized native chiefdoms interspersed with autonomous villages and tribal groups.

== Colonial period ==
=== 1699–1763: French period ===
French explorer Sieur d'Iberville led an exploration party up the Mississippi River in 1699. The explorers saw a red pole marking the boundary between the Houma and Bayagoula tribal hunting grounds. The French name le bâton rouge ("the red pole") is the translation of a native term rendered as Istrouma, possibly a corruption of the Choctaw iti humma "red pole"; André-Joseph Pénicaut, a carpenter traveling with d'Iberville, published the first full-length account of the expedition in 1723. According to Pénicaut,

From there [Manchacq] we went five leagues higher and found very high banks called écorts in that region, and in savage called Istrouma which means red stick [bâton rouge], as at this place there is a post painted red that the savages have sunk there to mark the land line between the two nations, namely: the land of the Bayagoulas which they were leaving and the land of another nation—thirty leagues upstream from the baton rouge—named the Oumas.

See also Red Sticks for the ceremonial use of red sticks among the Muscogee. The location of the red pole was presumably at Scott's Bluff, on what is now the campus of Southern University. It was reportedly a thirty-foot-high painted pole adorned with fish bones. The settlement of Baton Rouge by Europeans began in 1721 when a military post was established by French colonists.

=== 1763–1779: British period ===
On February 10, 1763, the Treaty of Paris was signed following France's defeat by Great Britain in the French and Indian War. France ceded its territory in North America to Britain and Spain; Britain gained all French lands east of the Mississippi, except New Orleans.

During the Great Expulsion concurrent with the French and Indian War, the North American front of the French and Indian War, British colonial officers expelled about 11,000 Acadians from Acadia from eastern Canada. Many were transported to France and subsequently resettled in southern Louisiana (New Spain); they settled in an area west and south of Baton Rouge that would come to be known as Acadiana. The first group of Acadian settlers arrived in 1765, with Joseph Broussard. (At this point the Mississippi River was the dividing line between the newly-Spanish jurisdiction on the west, including Acadiana, and the newly-British West Florida, including Baton Rouge, on the east side.)

Eventually the settlers began calling themselves Cajuns, a name derived from Acadians (French: Acadiens.) They maintained a separate culture from that of later Anglo-American Southern Baptist settlers, continuing their traditions of distinct clothing, music, food, and Catholic faith. Today their descendants are part of the rich cultural “gumbo” of the Baton Rouge area.

Baton Rouge, now part of the newly established British province of West Florida, suddenly had strategic significance as the southwesternmost corner of British North America. Spain for a period had rule of New Orleans and all of the former French lands on the west side of the Mississippi River. They administered numerous historically-French colonial towns, such as St. Louis and Ste. Genevieve in present-day Missouri.

Baton Rouge slowly developed as a town under British rule. The authorities, headquartered in Pensacola, awarded land grants and were successful in attracting European-American settlers. When the older British colonies on the Atlantic coast of North America rebelled, beginning in 1775, the newer colony of West Florida — lacking a history of local government and distrustful of the potentially hostile Spanish nearby — remained loyal to the British Crown.

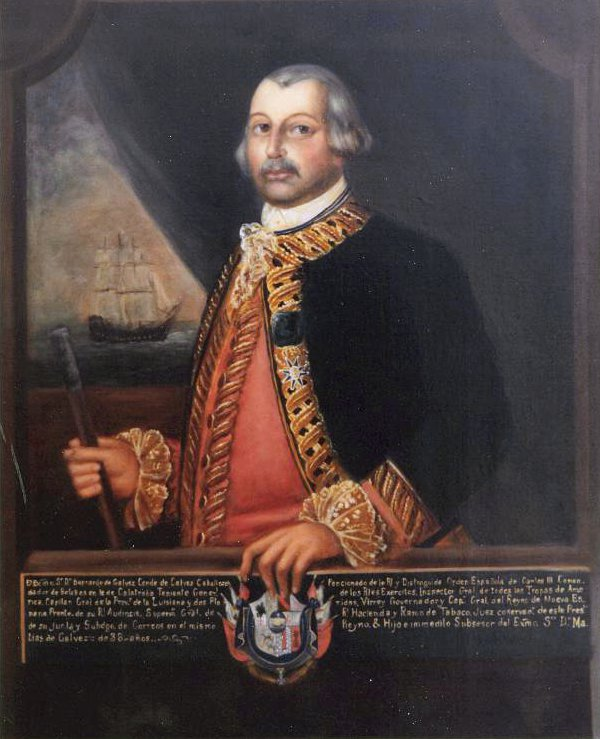
Spanish statesman and soldier Bernardo de Gálvez defeated the British colonial forces at Manchac, Baton Rouge, and Natchez in 1779.

In 1778 during the American Revolutionary War, France declared war on Britain, and in 1779 Spain followed suit. That year, the Spanish Governor Don Bernardo de Gálvez led a militia of nearly 1,400 soldiers and a small contingent of rebellious English-speaking colonials from New Orleans toward Baton Rouge. They were victorious in the Battle of Fort Bute and the naval Battle of Lake Pontchartrain, before capturing the recently constructed Fort New Richmond in the Battle of Baton Rouge. Spanish officials renamed the site Fort San Carlos and took control of Baton Rouge.

At the conclusion of the Revolutionary War, Great Britain turned West Florida over to Spain.

=== 1779–1810: Spanish period ===
A colony of Pennsylvania German farmers migrated north from Bayou Manchac, after a series of floods in the 1780s, and settled to the south of Baton Rouge. Known locally as "Dutch Highlanders" ("Dutch" being a corruption of Deutsch, in reference to their language), they settled along a line of bluffs that served as barrier to the Mississippi River floodplain.

Historic Highland Road, located in the heart of present-day Baton Rouge, was originally established as a supply road for the indigo and cotton plantations of the early settlers. The ethnic Germans named two major roads in the area, Essen and Siegen lanes, after cities in Germany. The Kleinpeter and Staring families were among the most prominent of the early German families in the area. Their descendants have remained active in local business affairs since.

In 1800, the Tessier-Lafayette buildings were built on what is now Lafayette Street and survive today. Development of sections followed. In 1805, the Spanish administrator, the Francophone creole Don Carlos Louis Boucher de Grand Pré, commissioned a plan for the area today known as Spanish Town. In 1806, Elias Beauregard led a planning commission for what is today known as Beauregard Town.

== Statehood to Civil War ==
=== 1810–1812: Republic of West Florida & Orleans Territory ===
The Bonnie Blue Flag of West Florida

As a result of the United States' 1803 Louisiana Purchase, it gained the former French territory in North America (retroceded by Spain to France). At that point, Spanish West Florida was almost entirely surrounded by the United States and its possessions. The Spanish fort at Baton Rouge became the only non-U.S. military post on the Mississippi River.

Several of the inhabitants of the Baton Rouge District began to organize conventions to plan a rebellion, among them Fulwar Skipwith, a Baton Rouge citizen. At least one meeting was held in a house on a street which has since been renamed Convention Street, in their honor. On September 23, 1810, the rebels overcame the Spanish garrison at Fort San Carlos; they unfurled the flag of the new Republic of West Florida, known as the Bonnie Blue Flag. The West Florida Republic existed for almost ninety (90) days, during which St. Francisville in present-day West Feliciana Parish served as its capital.

Seizing the opportunity, President James Madison ordered W. C. C. Claiborne to move in and seize the fledgling republic to annex into the Territory of Orleans. Madison used the premise that the territory had been a part of the U.S. since 1803, citing the terms of the Louisiana Purchase, an explanation largely believed to be a deliberate error. The rebels provided no resistance to Claiborne's forces. With minor resentment, they watched the "Stars and Stripes" raised on December 10, 1810. For the first time, nearly all of the land that would become the state of Louisiana lay within U.S. territorial borders.

=== 1812–1860: Early statehood & incorporation as capital ===
In 1812, Louisiana was admitted to the Union as a state, and in 1817 Baton Rouge was incorporated. As the town was a strategic military post, between 1819 and 1822 the U.S. Army built the Pentagon Barracks, which became a major command post through the Mexican–American War (1846–1848). Lieutenant Colonel Zachary Taylor supervised construction of the Pentagon Barracks and served as its commander. In the 1830s, what is known today as the "Old Arsenal" was built. The unique structure originally served as a gunpowder magazine for the U.S. Army post.

In 1825, Baton Rouge was visited by the Marquis de Lafayette, French hero of the American Revolution, as part of his triumphal tour of the United States. The town feted him as the guest of honor at a banquet and ball. To celebrate the occasion and honor him, the city changed the name of Second Street to Lafayette Street.

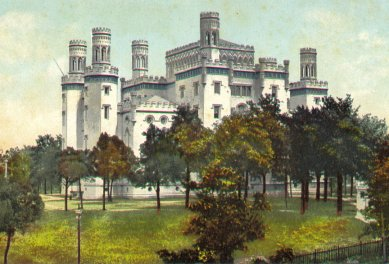
The old Louisiana State Capitol castle

In 1849, the Louisiana state legislature in New Orleans, dominated in number by wealthy rural planters, decided to move the seat of government to Baton Rouge. The majority of representatives feared a concentration of power in the state's largest city and the continuing strong influence of French Creoles in politics. In 1840, New Orleans' population was slightly over 102,000, then the third-largest city in the United States. Its thriving economy was largely sustained by the by-products of the domestic slave trade in addition to shipping; the city itself was the largest slave market in the nation. Products from the center of the country flowed through New Orleans for export, and ships arrived with a range of goods for the city and for towns and cities upriver. The 1840 population of Baton Rouge, on the other hand, was only 2,269.

New York architect James H. Dakin was hired to design the new capitol in Baton Rouge. Rather than mimic the federal Capitol Building in Washington, D.C., as so many other capitol designers had done, he conceived a neo-Gothic medieval castle, complete with turrets and crenellations, overlooking the Mississippi. In 1859, the Capitol was featured and favorably described in DeBow's Review, the most prestigious periodical in the antebellum South. But the riverboat pilot and writer Mark Twain loathed the sight; later in his Life on the Mississippi (1874), he wrote, "It is pathetic ... that a whitewashed castle, with turrets and things ... should ever have been built in this otherwise honorable place."

Twain wrote further of the city:

Baton Rouge was clothed in flowers, like a bride—no, much more so; like a greenhouse. For we were in the absolute South now—no modifications, no compromises, no half-way measures. The magnolia trees in the Capitol grounds were lovely and fragrant, with their dense rich foliage and huge snowball blossoms. ... We were certainly in the South at last; for here the sugar region begins, and the plantations—vast green levels, with sugar-mill and negro quarters clustered together in the middle distance—were in view.

During the first half of the nineteenth century, the city grew steadily as the result of steamboat trade and transportation. By the outbreak of the American Civil War in 1861, the population had more than doubled to nearly 5,500 people. The Civil War halted economic progress, but the city was not physically affected until it was occupied by Union forces in 1862.

=== 1860–1865: Civil War ===
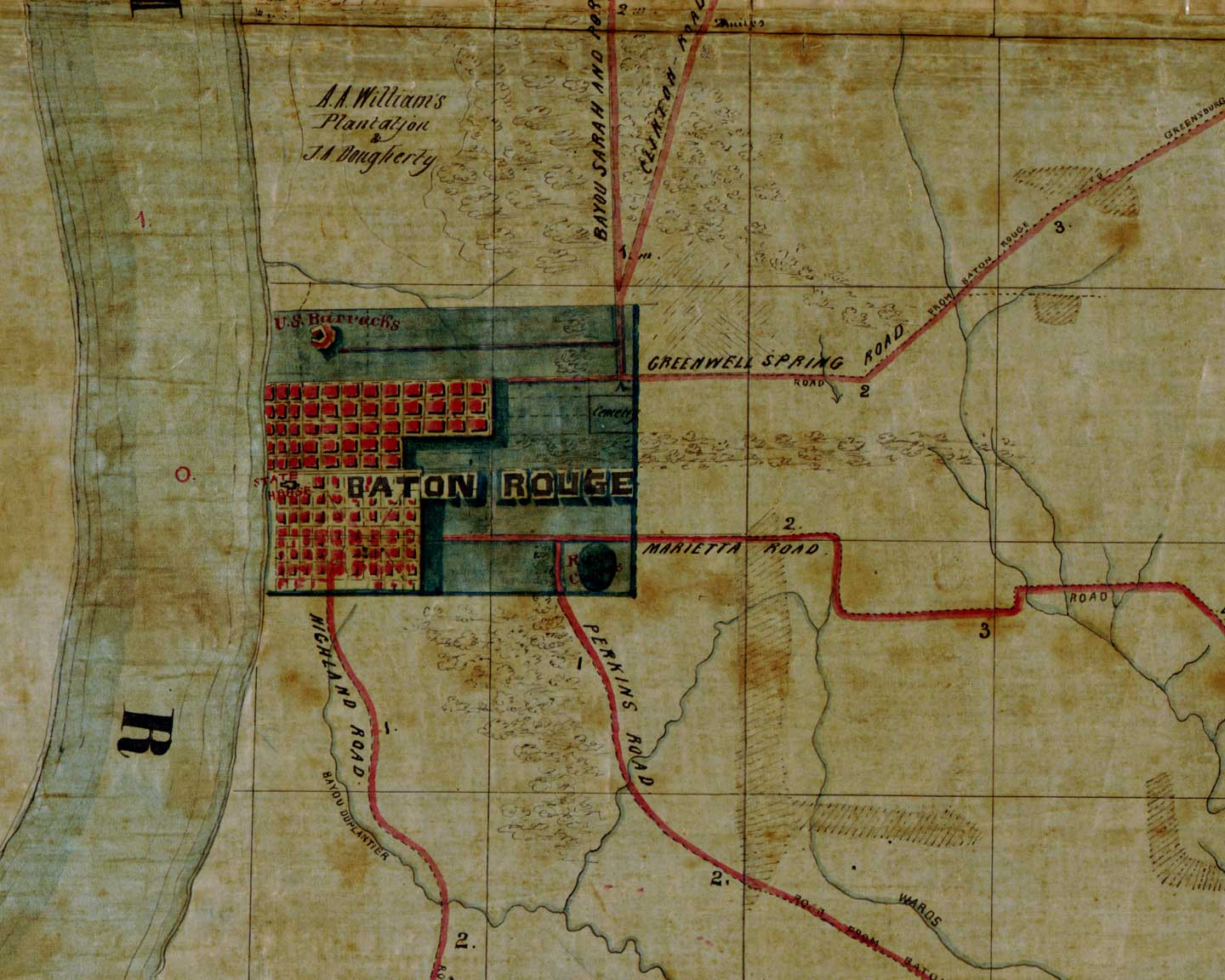
Map of Baton Rouge in 1863

The first state to secede was South Carolina in December 1860; other states soon followed.

In January 1861, Louisiana elected delegates to a state convention to decide the state's course of action. The convention voted for secession 112 to 17. Baton Rouge raised a number of volunteer companies for Confederate service, including the Pelican Rifles, the Delta Rifles, the Creole Guards, and the Baton Rouge Fencibles; about one-third of the town's male population eventually volunteered.

The Confederates gave up Baton Rouge (which had a population of 5,429 in 1860) with little resistance, deciding to consolidate their forces elsewhere. In May 1862, Union troops entered the city and began the occupation of Baton Rouge. Confederate soldiers made only one attempt to retake Baton Rouge. However, even with the assistance of an elite group known as the Barbarians—which was based in Louisiana—they were outnumbered and outgunned. The town was severely damaged. However, Baton Rouge escaped the extreme devastation faced by cities that were major conflict points during the Civil War, and it still has many structures that predate it.

== Reconstruction to Civil rights era ==
=== 1865–1900: Reconstruction era ===
The migration of many freedmen into towns and cities in the South was reflected in growth in the black population of Baton Rouge. They moved out of rural areas to escape white control and to seek jobs and education more available in towns, as well as the safety of being in their own communities. In 1860, blacks (mostly slaves) made up nearly one-third of the town's population. By the 1880 U.S. census, Baton Rouge was 60 percent black. It was not until the 1920 census that the white population of Baton Rouge exceeded 50 percent of the total.

During the Reconstruction Era, state-level offices were located in New Orleans, which was a base for U.S. troops. Elections after 1868 were increasingly accompanied by violence and fraud as whites sought to regain power and suppress black voting. Following a disputed gubernatorial election in 1872, in 1874 thousands of paramilitary White League members took over state government buildings in New Orleans for several days. Blacks continued to be elected to local office. Before the end of Reconstruction, signified by the withdrawal of Federal troops in 1877, the white Democratic Party politicians regained control of the state's and the city's political institutions. They had benefited from the violence and intimidation by white paramilitary groups such as the White League to suppress black voting.

By 1880, Baton Rouge was recovering economically from the war years. The city's population that year reached 7,197, while its boundaries were unchanged. The biracial coalition of the Reconstruction years had been replaced at the state level by white Democrats who loathed the Republicans, eulogized the Confederacy, and preached white supremacy. At the end of the century, white Democrats in the state legislature effectively disenfranchised freedmen and other blacks, including educated Louisiana Creole people, through changes to voter registration laws and the state constitution. They passed laws imposing legal racial segregation and "Jim Crow," imposing second-class status on African Americans. This system held into the 1960s until after passage of Federal civil rights legislation.

In 1886, a statue of a Confederate soldier was dedicated at the corner of Third Street and North Boulevard, in honor of those who fought for the Confederacy during the Civil War. In the early 21st century, the statue was removed to enable construction, beginning in 2010, of the North Boulevard Town Square, located directly behind the Old Louisiana State Capitol. After construction is completed, the statue is to be installed at a final site on the grounds of the Old Capitol building.

In the 1890s, a more management-oriented style of conservatism developed among whites in the city that continued into the early 20th century. Increased civic-mindedness and the arrival of the Louisville, New Orleans and Texas Railway stimulated investments in the local economy, attracted new businesses, and led to the development of more forward-looking leadership.

=== 1900–1953: Early to mid-20th century ===
The city constructed new waterworks, promoted widespread electrification of homes and businesses, and they passed several large bond issues for the construction of public buildings, new schools (which were racially segregated), paving of streets, drainage and sewer improvements, and the establishment of a municipal public health department. Due to the exclusion of blacks from politics via disfranchisement, the segregated facilities and residential areas for African Americans were under-funded. This segment of the population was under-served in general, although they received no relief from paying taxes.

By the beginning of the twentieth century, Baton Rouge was being industrialized due to its strategic location for the production of petroleum, natural gas, and salt. In 1909 the Standard Oil Company (predecessor of present-day ExxonMobil) built a facility that lured other petrochemical firms. Although the waterfront was flooded in 1912, the city escaped extensive damage then and during the Great Mississippi Flood of 1927 — which did extensive damage in Arkansas and the Mississippi Delta.

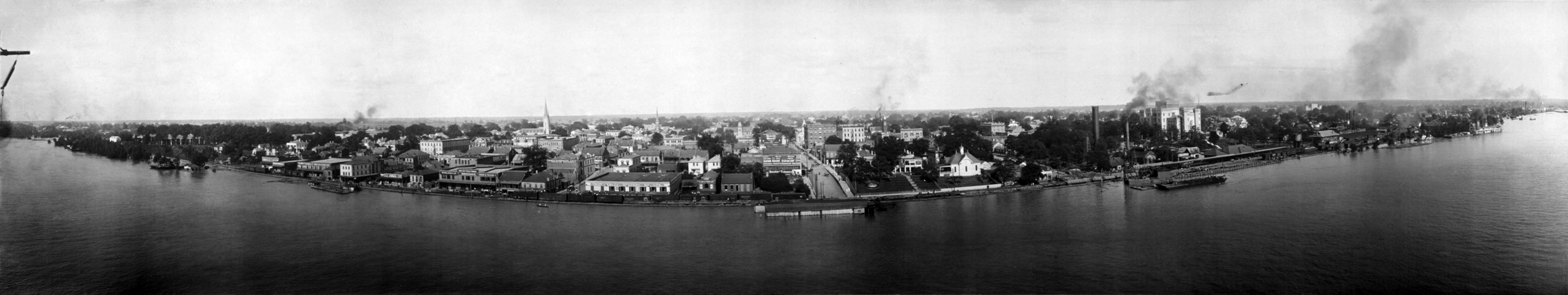
Baton Rouge waterfront during the record high water of the Mississippi River Flood of 1912

In 1932, during the Great Depression, Governor Huey P. Long directed the construction of a new Louisiana State Capitol, a public works project that was also a symbol of modernization. He also expanded and improved facilities to provide for the welfare of the people. The growth of the state government contributed to growth in related businesses and amenities for the city. Near the same time, both the Louisiana Institute for the Blind and the School for the Deaf and Dumb were built in Baton Rouge.

Capitol Building.

Throughout World War II, military demand for increased production at local chemical plants contributed to the growth of the city, generating many new defense jobs. In the late 1940s, Baton Rouge and East Baton Rouge Parish became a consolidated city/parish with a mayor/president leading the government. It was one of the first cities in the nation to consolidate with county government. The parish surrounds three other incorporated cities: Baker, Zachary, and Central.

=== 1953–1968: Civil rights era ===
In 1953 Baton Rouge was the site of the first bus boycott by African Americans of the civil rights movement. On June 20, 1953 black citizens of Baton Rouge began an organized boycott of the segregated municipal bus system that lasted for eight days. As they made up 80% of the riders, their boycott strongly affected city revenues and they objected to having the number of seats they could use be limited and to being forced to give up seats to white riders. The boycott served as the model for the more famous Montgomery bus boycott of 1955–1956.

The boycott was led by the newly formed United Defense League (UDL), under the direction of Willis Reed, later publisher of the Baton Rouge newspaper; Reverend T. J. Jemison and Raymond Scott. A volunteer "free ride" system, coordinated through black churches, supported the efforts and helped provide transportation for African Americans. In response to the boycott, the Baton Rouge city council adopted an ordinance that changed segregated seating so that black patrons would be enabled to fill up seats from the rear forward and whites would fill seats from front to back, both on a first-come-first-served basis. They avoided problems of an earlier ordinance by stipulating that the races did not sit in the same rows. In the view of many historians, the boycott's success in getting justice for black bus riders led the way for larger organized efforts within the civil rights movement. The actions and participants were commemorated June 19–21, 2003, on the 50th anniversary of the boycott. A community forum and events were held by Southern University and Louisiana State University.

The wave of student sit-ins that started in Greensboro, North Carolina, on February 1, 1960, reached Baton Rouge on March 28 when seven Southern University (SU) students were arrested for sitting-in at a Kress lunch counter to seek service. Public education was still segregated and SU was a historically black college. The following day, nine more students were arrested for sitting-in at the Greyhound Lines bus terminal. The next day Major Johns, an SU student and Congress of Racial Equality (CORE) member, led more than 3,000 students on a march to the state capitol to protest segregation and the arrests.

Major Johns and the 16 students arrested for sitting-in were expelled from SU and barred from all public colleges and universities in the state, threatening their education and future livelihoods. SU students organized a class boycott to win reinstatement of the expelled students. Fearing for the safety of their children, many parents withdrew their sons and daughters from the college. Eventually, the U.S. Supreme Court overturned the convictions of the arrested students. In 2004 they were awarded honorary degrees by Southern University and the state legislature passed a resolution in their honor.

In October 1961, SU students Ronnie Moore, Weldon Rougeau and Patricia Tate revived the Baton Rouge CORE chapter. After negotiations with downtown merchants failed to end segregation in retail stores, they called for a consumer boycott in early December, at the start of the busy holiday shopping season. Fourteen CORE pickets supporting the boycott were arrested in mid-December and held in jail for a month. More than 1,000 SU students marched to the state capitol on December 15 to protest. Police attacked them with dogs and tear-gas, and arrested more than 50 of them. Thousands rallied on the SU campus against segregation and in support of the arrested students. To prevent further disturbances, SU administrators closed the campus four days early for Christmas vacation .

In January 1962, U.S. Federal Judge Gordon West issued an injunction against CORE that banned all forms of protest of any kind at SU. The university expelled many activist students and state police troopers occupied the campus to quell further protests. Judge West's order was finally overturned by a higher court in 1964, but during the intervening years, civil rights activity was effectively suppressed.

In February 1962, Dion Diamond, a Freedom Rider and Student Nonviolent Coordinating Committee (SNCC) field secretary, was arrested for entering the SU campus to meet with students. He was charged with "criminal anarchy" — attempting to overthrow the government of the State of Louisiana. SNCC Chairman Chuck McDew and white field secretary Bob Zellner were also arrested and charged with "criminal anarchy" when they visited Diamond in jail. Zellner was put in a cell with white prisoners, who attacked him as a "race-mixer" while the guards looked on. After years of legal proceedings, the charges against Diamond were dropped, but Diamond was forced to serve 60 days for other charges. In 1964 and 1965, passage of federal civil rights legislation ended legal segregation and began to enforce African Americans' constitutional rights as citizens to vote and sit on juries.

== Late 20th century to present ==
In the 1970s, Baton Rouge experienced a boom in the petrochemical industry that resulted in expansion of the city away from the original center, resulting in the modern suburban sprawl. In recent years, however, government and business have begun a move back to the central district. A building boom that began in the 1990s continues today.

At the turn of the 21st century, Baton Rouge maintained steady population growth and became a technological leader among cities in the South. Earning a rank of Number 1 on the list of America's most wired cities (more wired than New Orleans and most of the 25 largest cities in the United States), Baton Rouge integrated advanced traffic camera systems, an extensive municipal broadband wireless network, and an advanced cellular telecommunications network into the city infrastructure. The city's 2000 Census population surpassed 225,000, exceeding that of regionally comparable cities including Mobile and Montgomery in Alabama and Corpus Christi in Texas.

On August 29, 2005, Hurricane Katrina slammed into the Louisiana Gulf Coast. Although the damage was relatively minor in Baton Rouge, the city had power outages and service disruptions due to the hurricane. In addition, the city provided refuge for residents from New Orleans. Baton Rouge served as a headquarters for Federal (on site) and State emergency coordination and disaster relief in Louisiana.

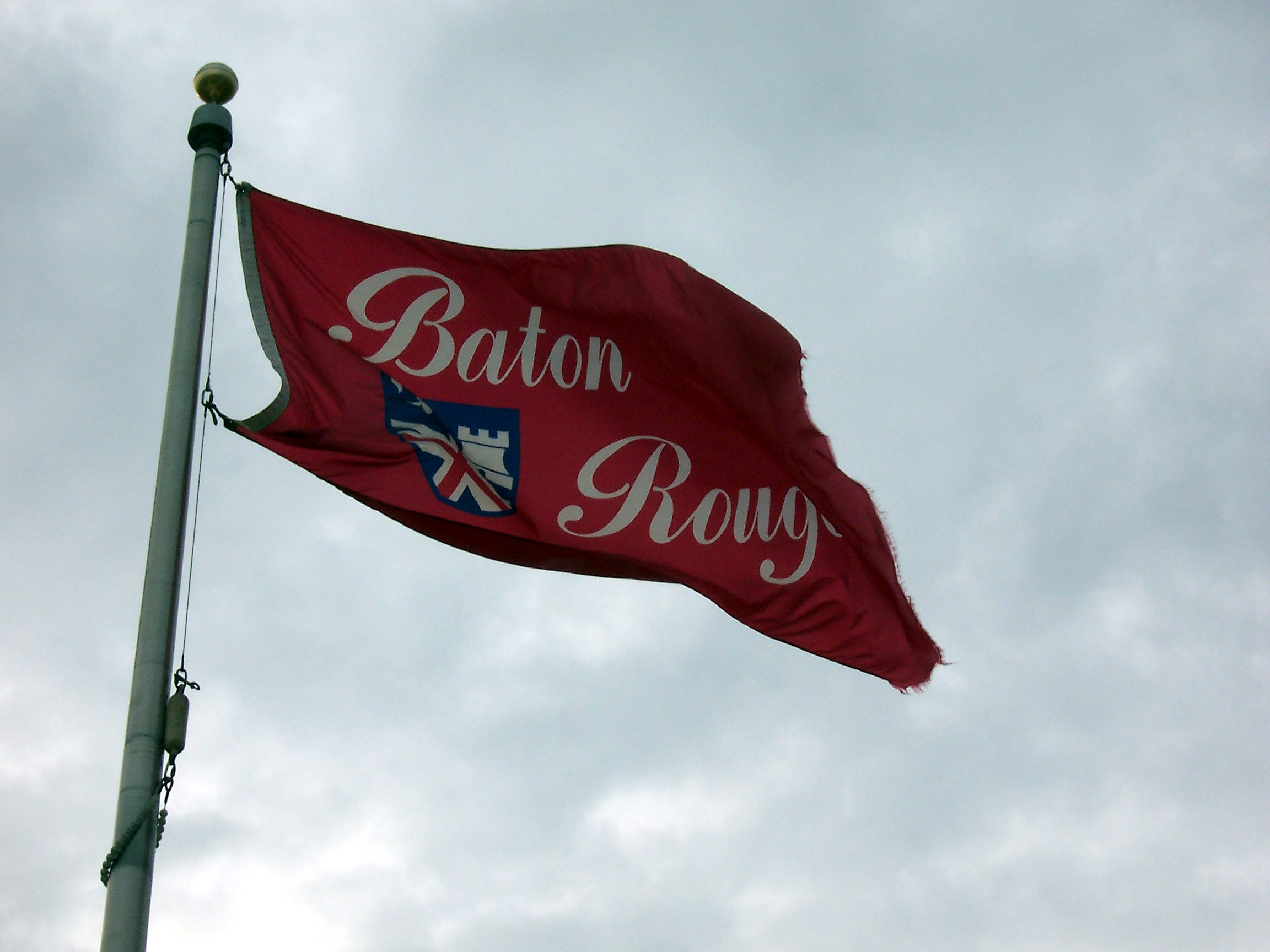
The flag of Baton Rouge flies on a cloudy day.

By the end of the 2000s decade, Baton Rouge was one of the largest mid-sized American business cities and one of the fastest-growing metropolitan areas with populations under 1 million — with 633,261 residents in 2000 and an estimated 750,000 in 2008. (Baton Rouge's city population mushroomed after Hurricane Katrina as residents from the New Orleans metropolitan area moved to escape the devastation; estimates in late 2005 put the displaced population at about 200,000 in the Baton Rouge area. Most returned to their original locations.)

Due to the hurricane refugees returning home and native Baton Rouge residents migrating to outlying parishes such as Livingston and Ascension, the U.S. Census Bureau in its 2007–08 estimate designated Baton Rouge as the second-fastest city in declining population. Baton Rouge has embarked on a process of urban growth and renewal, concentrating on downtown attractions. North Boulevard Town Square, for instance, provides both a place for city-center events and re-creates a connection to the river.

== See also ==
- Timeline of Baton Rouge, Louisiana
- History of Louisiana
