= Timeline of Baton Rouge, Louisiana =

The following is a timeline of the history of the city of Baton Rouge, Louisiana, USA.

== Prior to 19th century ==
- 1721 – Fort established by French.
- 1763 – Period of British West Florida begins.
- 1779 – September: Battle of Baton Rouge at Fort New Richmond, during the Gulf Coast campaign of the American Revolutionary War.
- 1783 – Period of Spanish West Florida officially begins; Baton Rouge fort has been renamed Fort San Carlos.

== 19th century ==
- 1805 – Spanish Town, first residential area, is established.
- 1806 – Beauregard Town, second neighborhood, is established.
- 1810 – Baton Rouge becomes part of the Republic of West Florida in September, but by December the republic is annexed by the U.S. into the Territory of Orleans, which in 1812 becomes the state of Louisiana.
- 1812-1815 – War of 1812, including the Creek War and the Battle of New Orleans
- 1817 – Town incorporated.
- 1819 – Baton-Rouge Gazette newspaper begins publication.
- 1833 – State Library of Louisiana headquartered in Baton Rouge.
- 1835 – Louisiana State Penitentiary in operation.
- 1842 – Democratic Advocate newspaper begins publication.
- 1849 – Baton Rouge becomes capital of Louisiana.
- 1850 – First Capitol building constructed.
- 1852 – Louisiana Institute for the Education of the Deaf and Dumb and Blind and Magnolia Cemetery established.
- 1860 – Andrew Lytle photography studio in business.
- 1861 – January 23: Louisiana secession convention held.
- 1862
  - May 12: City occupied by U.S. federal troops.
  - August 5: Battle of Baton Rouge (1862).
- 1867 – Baton Rouge National Cemetery established.
- 1868 – St. Joseph's Academy founded.
- 1869 – Seminary of Learning of the State of Louisiana relocated to Baton Rouge.
- 1870 – Seminary renamed "Louisiana State University".
- 1877 – Synagogue dedicated.
- 1882 – State capital returns to Baton Rouge, following the Reconstruction Era.
- 1897 – Audubon Sugar School of Louisiana State University founded.

== 20th century ==
- 1905 – Daily State newspaper in publication.
- 1909 – Baton Rouge Refinery commissioned.
- 1914 – Southern University relocates to Scotlandville, along Scott's Bluff facing the Mississippi River in North Baton Rouge.
- 1916 – Historical Society of East and West Baton Rouge established.
- 1923 – Baton Rouge General Hospital active.
- 1924 – Community Coffee in business.
- 1926
  - New Louisiana State University campus dedicated.
  - Baton Rouge High School and Arcade Theatre built.
  - Louisiana Municipal Association headquartered in Baton Rouge.
- 1928
  - City Park Golf Course opens.
  - Louisiana State University's College of Commerce established.
- 1929 – State Theater built.
- 1932 – Current Louisiana State Capitol inaugurated.
- 1934 - WJBO radio begins broadcasting.
- 1935 – Huey P. Long assassinated.
- 1939 – East Baton Rouge Parish Library established.
- 1940
  - Baton Rouge League of Women Voters founded.
  - Population: 34,719.
- 1944 – Piccadilly Restaurant in business.
- 1947
  - City and Parish of East Baton Rouge consolidated.
  - Baton Rouge Civic Symphony Orchestra active.
  - H. J. Wilson Co. in business.
- 1950 – Population: 125,629.
- 1953
  - June 20–28: Baton Rouge bus boycott held during Civil Rights Movement.
  - WAFB-TV (television) begins broadcasting.
- 1955 – WBRZ-TV begins broadcasting.
- 1960
  - Baton Rouge sit-ins, marches, and demonstrations by Southern University students during the Civil Rights Movement.
  - Broadmoor High School founded.
  - Population: 152,419.
- 1961 – Roman Catholic Diocese of Baton Rouge established.
- 1962
  - January 19: "Protestors force Southern University...to temporarily shut down."
  - City Parish Beautification Commission established.
- 1963 – Foundation for Historical Louisiana headquartered in Baton Rouge.
- 1964 – Baton Rouge Chapter of the Links established.
- 1970
  - Baton Rouge Zoo established near city.
  - Population: 165,963.
- 1974 – One American Place (hi-rise) built.
- 1976 – Cortana Mall Cinema in business.
- 1978 – Comité des Archives de la Louisiane founded.
- 1979 – Louisiana Association of Museums headquartered in city.
- 1980 - Population: 219,419.
- 1981 – LSU Hilltop Arboretum established.
- 1982 – City and Parish of East Baton Rouge governments merged.
- 1986 – Atchafalaya National Wildlife Refuge established near city.
- 1987 - Richard Baker becomes U.S. representative for Louisiana's 6th congressional district.
- 1990 – Population: 219,531.
- 1997
  - Mall of Louisiana in business.
  - Datta Temple & Hall of Trinity consecrated.
- 1998 – City website online.

== 21st century ==
- 2001: Bobby Simpson becomes mayor-president of East Baton Rouge Parish.
- 2005
  - August 29: Hurricane Katrina.
  - First African-American, Kip Holden, becomes mayor-president of East Baton Rouge Parish.
  - Shaw Center for the Arts opens.
- 2007: Cinemark 16 Perkins Rowe (cinema) in business.
- 2010: Population: 229,493 city; 440,171 parish.
- 2011: Cedric Richmond becomes U.S. representative for Louisiana's 2nd congressional district.
- 2012
  - April: Exxon Baton Rouge Refinery pipeline oil spill.
  - June 14: Exxon Baton Rouge Refinery benzene leak.
- 2016
  - July 5: Alton Sterling was fatally shot by a police officer, which led to protests in Baton Rouge.
  - July 9: Protest against police violence.
  - July 17: 2016 shooting of Baton Rouge police officers
  - August: 2016 Louisiana floods submerge thousands of homes throughout the parish

== See also ==
- History of Baton Rouge, Louisiana
- List of mayors of Baton Rouge, Louisiana
- National Register of Historic Places listings in East Baton Rouge Parish, Louisiana
- Other cities in Louisiana:
  - Timeline of New Orleans
  - Timeline of Shreveport, Louisiana

== Bibliography ==
Published in the 19th century

- "Baton Rouge". Commercial Directory of the Western States. St. Louis: Richard Edwards. 1867.
- "Mississippi River: Baton Rouge". James' River Guide ... Mississippi Valley. Cincinnati: U.P. James. 1871.

Published in the 20th century

- "Baton Rouge". Automobile Blue Book. USA. 1919.
- Federal Writers' Project (1941). "Baton Rouge". Louisiana: a Guide to the State. American Guide Series. NY: Hastings House. hdl:2027/uc1.$b727648. ISBN 9780403021697. + Chronology
- Wm. L. Richter (1969). "Slavery in Baton Rouge, 1820–1860". Louisiana History. 10 (2): 125–145. JSTOR 4231058.
- Sidney Tobin (1969). "The Early New Deal in Baton Rouge as Viewed by the Daily Press". Louisiana History. 10 (4): 307–337. JSTOR 4231090.
- Meyers, Rose. A History of Baton Rouge, 1699–1812 (1976)
- Ory Mazar Nergal, ed. (1980), "Baton Rouge", Encyclopedia of American Cities, New York: E.P. Dutton, OL 4120668M
- George Thomas Kurian (1994), "Baton Rouge", World Encyclopedia of Cities, vol. 1: North America, Santa Barbara, Calif.: ABC-CLIO, OL 1431653M (fulltext via Open Library)

Published in the 21st century

- Connie H. Nobles (2000). "Gazing upon the Invisible: Women and Children at the Old Baton Rouge Penitentiary". American Antiquity. 65 (1): 5–14. doi:10.2307/2694805. JSTOR 2694805. S2CID 146836012.
- "Plantation Country: Baton Rouge", Louisiana & the Deep South, Lonely Planet, 2001, ISBN 9781864502169, OL 22985322M (fulltext via Open Library)
- Florence M. Jumonville (2002). "East Baton Rouge". Louisiana History: An Annotated Bibliography. Greenwood. p. 524+. ISBN 978-0-313-28240-9.
- "Baton Rouge/E.B.R. Parish, LA". U.S. City Open Data Census. Sunlight Foundation and Open Knowledge International. 2018. Archived from the original on November 18, 2018.
