= Battle of Baton Rouge =

Historical battles fought in and around the city of Baton Rouge, Louisiana include:

- Battle of Baton Rouge (1779), Spanish victory in the American Revolutionary War
- Battle of Baton Rouge (1862), Union victory in the American Civil War
