= West Indies and Gulf Coast campaigns =

The West Indies and Gulf Coast campaigns may refer to:

- The West Indies campaign of the Anglo-French War
- The Gulf Coast campaign of American Revolutionary War
