= Gulf Coast campaign =

1779–81 Spanish invasion of British West Florida

- Part of the American Revolutionary War
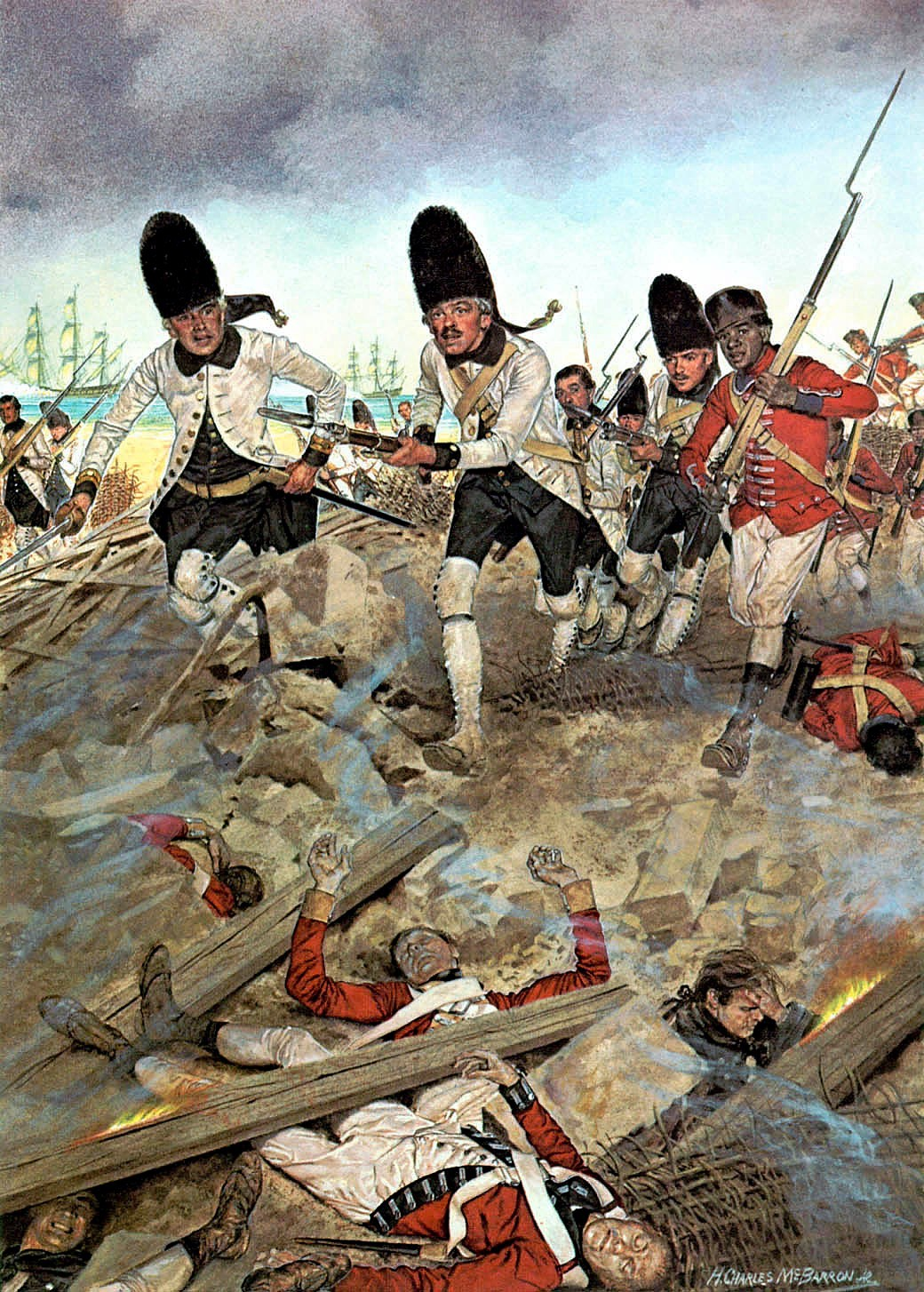
- Spanish Troops at Pensacola, Florida by H. Charles McBarron Jr., showing the Louisiana Regiment (white coats) and the Company of Free Blacks of Havana (red coats) storming Fort George at Pensacola.
Date	1779–1781
Location	British West Florida
Result	Spanish victory

Belligerents
Spain; France; United States; Choctaw	Great Britain: Waldeck; Choctaw Creek

Commanders and leaders
(Spanish Empire) Bernardo de Gálvez (WIA); (Spanish Empire) Francisco de Miranda; (Spanish Empire) José Calvo de Irazabal; (Spanish Empire) José Solano y Bote; (Spanish Empire) Juan Manuel de Cagigal; (Kingdom of France) François-Aymar de Monteil; (United States) William Pickles	(Kingdom of Great Britain) John Campbell (surrendered); (Kingdom of Great Britain) Alexander Dickson (surrendered); Johann von Hanxleden †; Konrad von Horn (surrendered)

The Gulf Coast campaign or the Spanish conquest of West Florida in the American Revolutionary War, was a series of military operations primarily directed by the governor of Spanish Louisiana, Bernardo de Gálvez, against the British province of West Florida. Begun with operations against British positions on the Mississippi River shortly after Britain and Spain went to war in 1779, Gálvez completed the conquest of West Florida in 1781 with the successful siege of Pensacola.

== Background ==
Spain officially entered the American Revolutionary War on May 8, 1779, with a formal declaration of war by King Charles III. This was after the Treaty of Aranjuez (1779) . This declaration was followed by another on 8 July that authorized his colonial subjects to engage in hostilities against the British. When Bernardo de Gálvez, the colonial Governor of Spanish Louisiana, received word of this on 21 July, he immediately began to secretly plan offensive operations. Gálvez, who had been planning for the possibility of war since April, intercepted communications from the British at Pensacola indicating that the British were planning a surprise attack on New Orleans; he decided to launch his own attack first. To that end, he concealed from the public his receipt of the second proclamation.

By the early 19th century, Spanish West Florida had a population of roughly 3,000 residents, concentrated mainly in the settlements of Pensacola, Mobile, and St. Marks, with additional settlers and traders living among nearby Native American communities.

== Control of the lower Mississippi ==
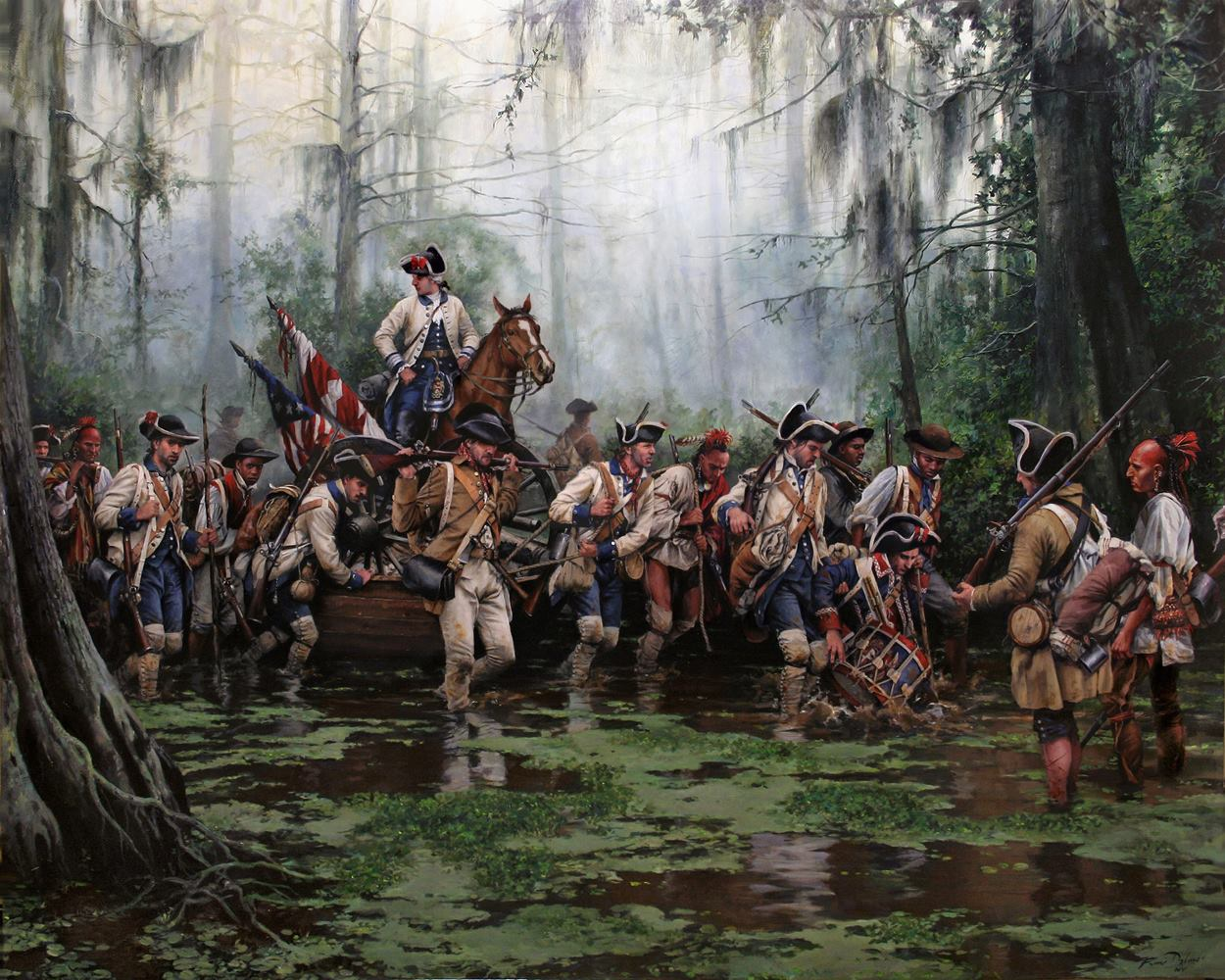
Painting depicting the Spanish advance at the lower Mississippi by Augusto Ferrer-Dalmau

On August 27, Gálvez set out by land toward Baton Rouge, leading a force that consisted of 520 regulars (about two-thirds of them recent recruits), 60 militiamen, 80 free blacks and mulattoes, and ten Anglo-American volunteers headed by Oliver Pollock. As they marched upriver, the force grew by another 600 men, including Indians and Acadians. At its peak, the force numbered over 1,400; this number was reduced due to the hardships of the march, by several hundred, before they reached Fort Bute.

At dawn on September 7, this force attacked Fort Bute, a decaying relic of the French and Indian War that was defended by a token force. After a brief skirmish in which one German was killed, most of the garrison surrendered. The six who escaped capture made their way to Baton Rouge to notify the British troops there of the fort's capture.

After a few days' rest, Gálvez advanced on Baton Rouge, only 15 miles (24 km) from Fort Bute. When Gálvez arrived at Baton Rouge on 12 September, he found Fort New Richmond garrisoned by over 400 regular army troops and 150 militia, under the overall command of Lt. Colonel Alexander Dickson. After nine days' siege, Dickson surrendered.

Gálvez demanded and was granted terms that included the capitulation of the 80 Elite Grenadiers from the newly arrived 60th Regiment of Foote at Fort Panmure (modern Natchez, Mississippi), a well-fortified position which would have been difficult for Gálvez to take militarily. Dickson surrendered 375 regular troops the next day; Gálvez had Dickson's militia disarmed and sent home. Gálvez then sent a detachment of 50 men to take control of Panmure. He dismissed his own militia companies, left a sizable garrison at Baton Rouge, and returned to New Orleans with about 50 men.

== Mobile ==
In early 1780, Gálvez embarked on an expedition to capture Mobile, which was one of only two major British military establishments left in West Florida; the other was the capital, Pensacola. Assembling 750 men in New Orleans, he sailed for Mobile on January 11, reaching Mobile Bay on February 9 after being delayed by storms. He was joined on February 20 by a supporting force of 450 from Havana, but did not begin siege operations until March 1. After 14 days of bombardment, Fort Charlotte's walls were breached, and its commander, Captain Elias Durnford, surrendered.

Gálvez in the fall of 1780 sought to capture Pensacola, launching his naval force from Mobile, but the fleet was dispersed by a major hurricane. Its tattered remnants made their way back to either Havana or New Orleans, and planning began again for an expedition in 1781.

British authorities in Pensacola had, when war with Spain was imminent, attempted to shore up West Florida's defenses, but the meager resources allocated to the region meant that General John Campbell, the military commander at Pensacola, had been able to do little to stop Gálvez's advance. By late 1780, he received some reinforcements, and managed to recruit a significant force of local Indians to bolster Pensacola's defenses. The destruction of Gálvez's expedition emboldened him to attempt the recapture of Mobile. In January 1781 he dispatched more than 700 men under the command of the Waldecker Colonel Johann von Hanxleden to go overland. This force was defeated when it attacked one of the forward Spanish defenses of Mobile, and Colonel Hanxleden was killed. The attack prompted Spanish authorities in Cuba to enlarge the Mobile garrison.

== Pensacola ==
In February 1781, Gálvez and Spanish authorities in Cuba again launched an expedition against Pensacola, with support from French and Spanish naval forces. Even after a 1780 hurricane destroyed his first invasion fleet, he still came back with forces that eventually numbered about 8,000. With all the forces in place, Gálvez started his first blockade at the Pensacola harbor, and then began siege operations on March 9. During the siege, multiple native attacks occurred, but they did not deter the Spanish. By April 30, the Spanish successfully placed cannons that could fully attack the main Pensacola defenses. A well-aimed shot struck the powder magazine in one of the outer defenses on May 8, and the Spanish quickly capitalized upon this development by capturing the British position. Realizing his position was no longer tenable, Campbell opened surrender negotiations the next day. The terms of capitulation included all of British West Florida.

== Aftermath and Wider Spanish Operations ==
Shortly after the Gulf Coast campaign ended, Spanish forces expanded their operations to the Bahamas. Juan Manuel Cagigal y Monserrat, under the command of Bernardo de Gálvez, disobeyed orders and captured the Bahamas by convincing Vice Admiral John Maxwell, a British commander, to surrender. These victories further weakened British influence in the region and complemented Spain’s successes along the Gulf Coast.

== Bibliography ==
- Gayarré, Charles (1867). History of Louisiana : The Spanish domination, Volume 3. New York: Widdleton. OCLC 1855106.
- Haarmann, Albert (October 1960). "The Spanish Conquest of British West Florida, 1779–1781". The Florida Historical Quarterly. 39 (2): 107–134. JSTOR 30150253.
- Nester, William R (2004). The Frontier War for American Independence. Mechanicsburg, PA: Stackpole Books. ISBN 978-0-8117-0077-1. OCLC 52963301.
- Beerman, Eric (1981). "Arturo O'Neill: First Governor of West Florida during the Second Spanish Period". The Florida Historical Quarterly. 60 (1): 29–41. ISSN 0015-4113.
- Worcester, Donald E. (1967). "Review of Spain's Final Triumph over Great Britain in the Gulf of Mexico: The Battle of Pensacola, March 9 to May 8, 1781". The American Historical Review. 72 (3): 1079–1080. doi:10.2307/1846835. ISSN 0002-8762.
- Chavez, Thomas E. Spain and the Independence of the United States: An Intrinsic Gift, University of New Mexico Press, 2003.
