= Siege of Pensacola =

1781 battle of the American Revolutionary War

- Part of the Gulf Coast campaign
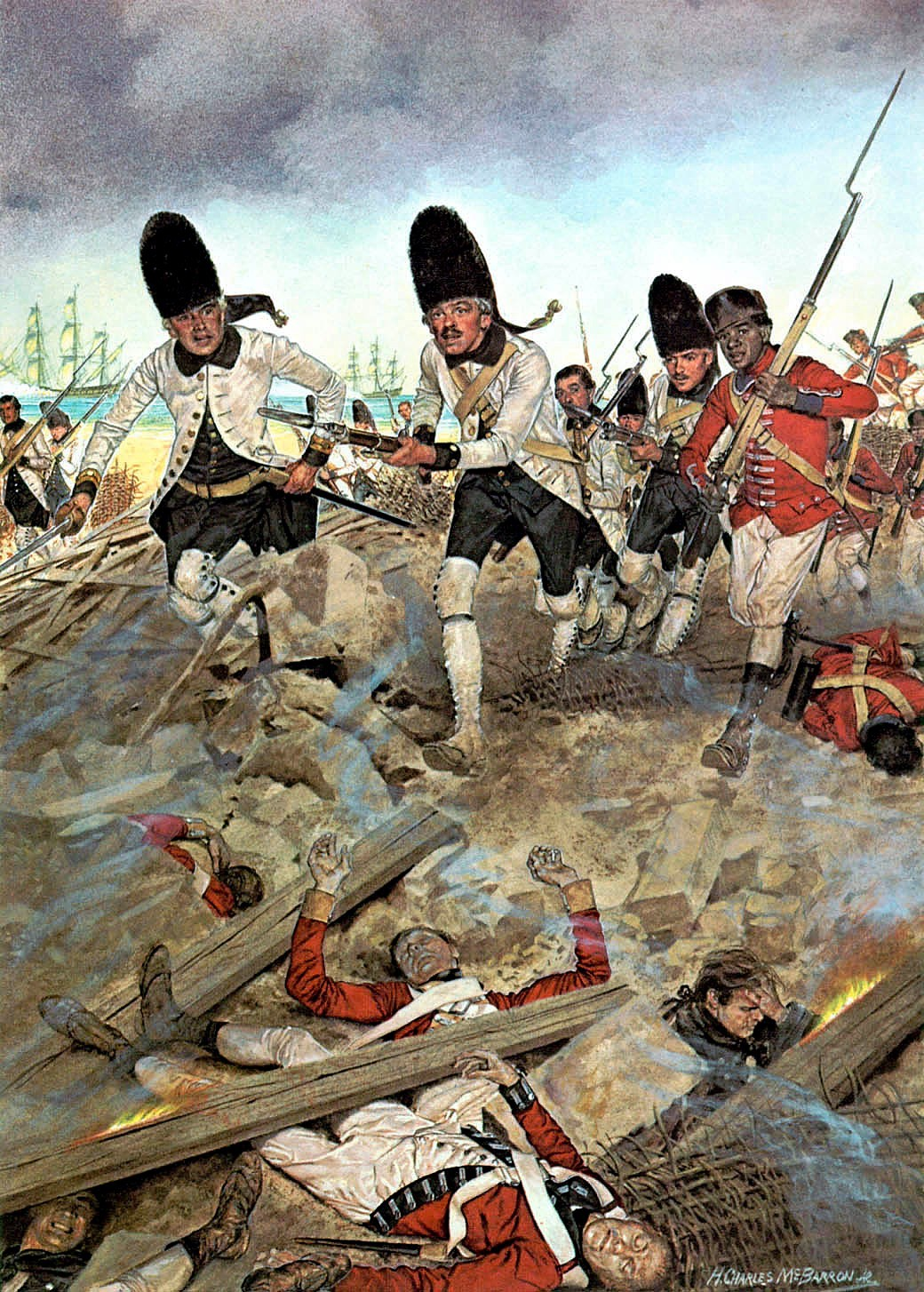
- Spanish troops storming British positions during the siege
Date	March 9 – May 10, 1781 (2 months and 1 day)
Location	Pensacola, West Florida (present-day Florida) 30°20′52″N 87°17′50″W
Result	Franco-Spanish victory
Territorial changes	Spanish gain control of West Florida

Belligerents
Spain; France	Great Britain: Waldeck; Choctaw Creek

Commanders and leaders
(Spanish Empire) Bernardo de Gálvez (WIA); (Spanish Empire) Francisco de Miranda; (Spanish Empire) José Calvo de Irazabal; (Spanish Empire) José Solano y Bote; (Spanish Empire) Juan Manuel de Cagigal; (Kingdom of France) François-Aymar de Monteil	(Kingdom of Great Britain) John Campbell (surrendered); Konrad von Horn (surrendered)

Strength
7,400 regulars and militia 10,000 sailors and marines 21 ships (Including 1,500 French sailors and 750 French soldiers)	1,300 regulars, rangers and militia 500 Natives

Casualties and losses
Losses: 297; 95 killed; 202 wounded	Total Losses: 1373 Soldier 2 Ship; 155 killed; 105 wounded; 1,113 captured; 2 sloops captured
- Location within North America

The siege of Pensacola, fought from March 9 to May 10, 1781, was the culmination of Spain's conquest of West Florida during the Gulf Coast Campaign of the American Revolutionary War. The siege was commanded by Bernardo de Gálvez, whose nearly 8,000 troops ultimately overran the British forces in the region. The success of the siege resulted in Gálvez' promotion to governor of West Florida and Louisiana.

== Background ==
When Spain entered the American Revolutionary War in 1779, Bernardo de Gálvez, the energetic governor of Spanish Louisiana, immediately began offensive operations to gain control of West Florida beginning with his assault at Fort Bute. In September 1779 he gained control over the lower Mississippi River by capturing Fort Bute and then shortly thereafter obtaining the surrender of the remaining forces following the Battle of Baton Rouge. He followed up these successes with the capture of Mobile on March 14, 1780, after a brief siege.

Gálvez began planning an assault on Pensacola, West Florida's capital, using forces from Havana with the recently captured Mobile as the launching point for the attack. British reinforcements arriving in Pensacola in April 1780 delayed the expedition, however, and when an invasion fleet finally sailed in October it was dispersed by Solano's Hurricane a few days later. Gálvez spent nearly a month regrouping the fleet at Havana.

=== British defenses ===
Following the outbreak of hostilities with Spain in 1779, General John Campbell, concerned over the condition of the defenses, requested reinforcements and began construction of additional defenses. By early 1781 the Pensacola garrison consisted of the 16th Regiment, a battalion from the 60th, and 7 (Johnstones) Company of the 4th Battalion Royal Artillery (Present day 20 Battery Royal Artillery, 16 Regiment Royal Artillery). These were augmented by the Third Regiment of Waldeck and the Maryland Loyalist Battalion, as well as the Pennsylvania Loyalists. These troops were provincial soldiers rather than militia.

In addition to the Loyalist soldiers, some bands of Indians supported the British. After the fall of Mobile in March 1780, between 1,500 and 2,000 Indians had come at various points to Pensacola to join in its defense. These allies included the Choctaw and Creek, with Creeks being the most numerous. Just before the Spanish attack about 800 Indian braves remained in Pensacola, as Campbell, not realizing the attack was imminent, had sent about 300 away. During the siege and battle there were ultimately about 500 of these left at Pensacola, due to efforts of the Creeks to take a more "balanced" role by offering supplies to both sides and diminishing their role on the British side. The majority of the warrior bands still present during the siege were Choctaw.

Gálvez had received detailed descriptions of the state of the defenses in 1779, when he sent an aide there ostensibly to discuss the return of escaped slaves, although Campbell had made numerous changes since then. Pensacola's defensive works in early 1781 consisted of Fort George, an earthen works topped by a palisade that was rebuilt under Campbell's directions in 1780. North of the fort he had built the Prince of Wales Redoubt, and to its northwest was the Queen's Redoubt, also built in 1780. Campbell erected a battery called Fort Barrancas Colorada near the mouth of the bay.

=== Spanish forces ===
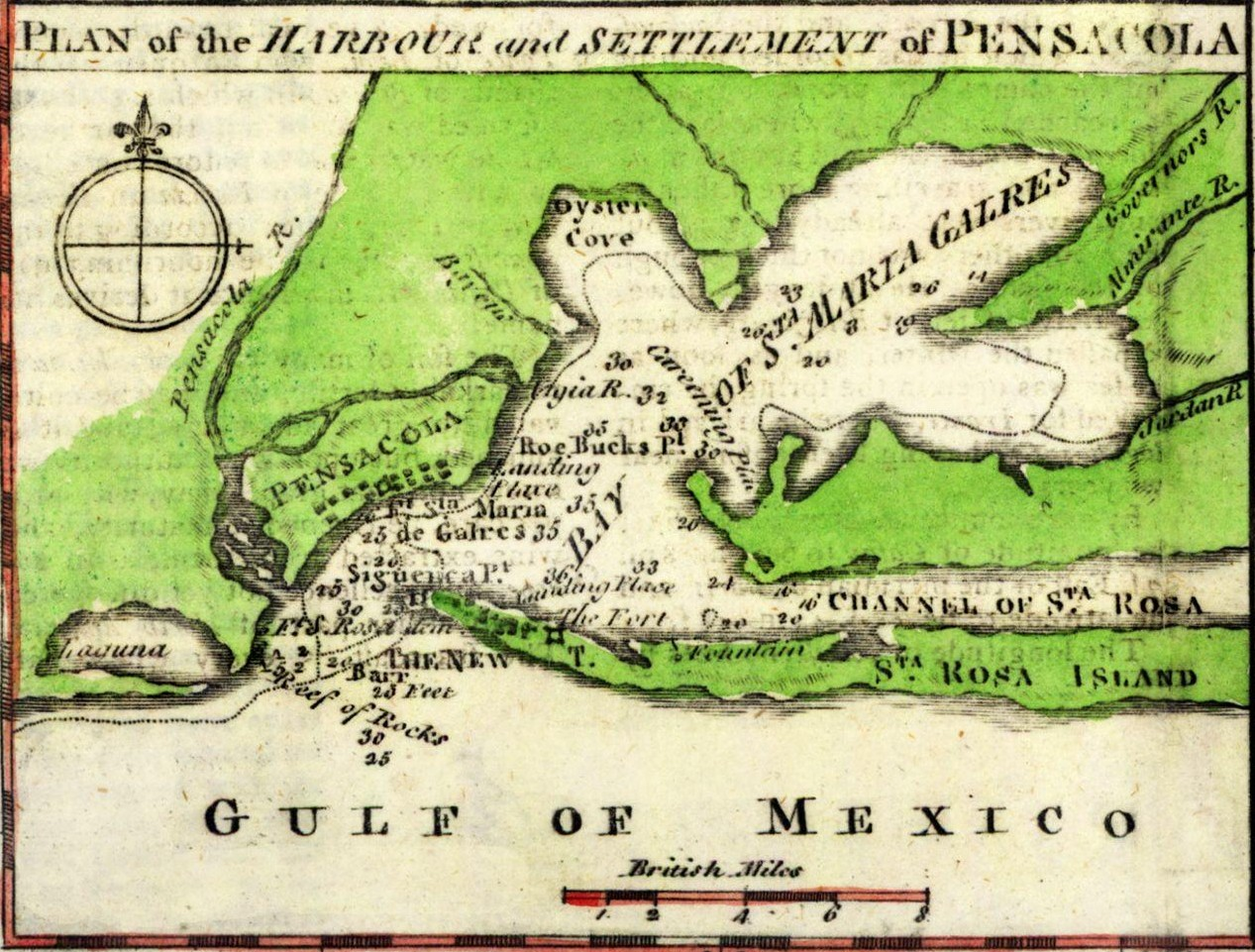
A 1763 map depicting Pensacola Bay

Gálvez embarked his flag with the Spanish fleet, under the command of Captain José Calvo de Irazabal. With about 1,300 men, the regular troops included a Mallorcan regiment and Arturo O'Neill commanding 319 men of Spain's Irish Hibernia Regiment, and including militias of biracial and free Afro-Cubans. Gálvez had also ordered additional troops from New Orleans and Mobile to assist.

The Spanish expeditionary force sailed from Havana on February 13. Arriving outside Pensacola Bay on March 9, Gálvez landed some troops on Santa Rosa Island, the barrier island protecting the bay. O'Neill's Hibernians landed at the island battery, which he found undefended, and set up artillery which he used to drive away the British ships taking shelter in the bay. However, bringing the Spanish ships into the bay turned out to be difficult, just as it had been the previous year at the capture of Mobile. Supplies were offloaded onto Santa Rosa Island to raise the draft of some of the ships, but Calvo, the fleet commander, refused to send any more ships through the channel after the lead ship, the 64-cannon San Ramon, grounded in its attempt. Furthermore, some British guns seemed to have the range to fire on the bay's entrance.

Gálvez used his authority as governor of Louisiana to commandeer the ships that were from Louisiana. He boarded the Gálveztown, and on March 18 he sailed her through the channel and into the bay. The three other Louisiana ships followed him, under what proved to be ineffective British artillery fire. After sending Calvo a detailed description of the channel, his captains all insisted on making the crossing, which they did the next day. Calvo, claiming that his assignment to deliver Gálvez' invasion force was now complete, sailed back to Havana in the San Ramon.

== Siege ==
On March 24, the Spanish army and its accompanying militia moved to the center of operations. O'Neill served as aide-de-camp and commander of the scout patrols. Once the bay had been entered, O'Neill's scouts landed on the mainland and blunted an attack by 400 mainly pro-British Choctaw Indians on the afternoon of March 28. The scouts soon joined forces with the Spanish troops arriving from Mobile.

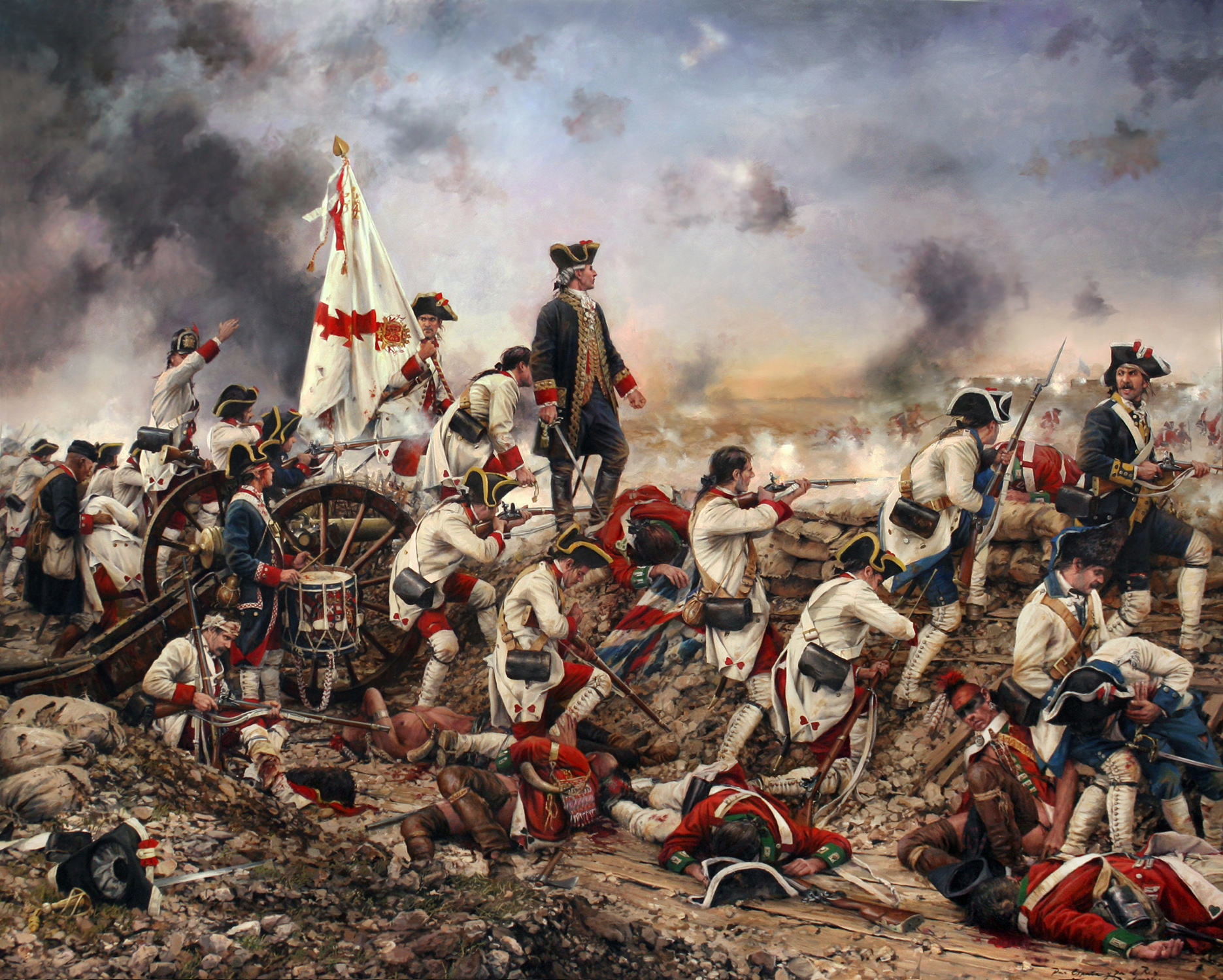
Painting of Spanish troops under Bernardo de Gálvez following their repulse of a British and Native sortie

During the first weeks of April, O'Neill's scouts reconnoitered the Pensacola fortifications. The redoubt farthest from the city was the Crescent. Next distant was the Sombrero, followed by Fort George. The Spanish troops established encampments and began extensive preparations for a siege. Hundreds of engineers and laborers brought supplies and armaments to the battlefield. The engineers also dug trenches and built bunkers and redoubts, besides constructing a covered road to shield the troops from the constant fire of grapeshot, grenades, and cannonballs. On April 12, Gálvez was wounded while viewing the British fortifications. Battlefield command was formally transferred to Colonel José de Ezpeleta, a personal friend of Gálvez.

A second attack by the Choctaws began on April 19, interrupting the siege preparations, and that day a large fleet was sighted heading towards the bay. Although at first thought to be bringing British reinforcements, the ships turned out to be the combined Spanish and French fleet from Havana commanded by José Solano y Bote and François-Aymar de Monteil, having on board Spanish Field Marshal Juan Manuel de Cagigal. Reports of a British squadron sighted near Cape San Antonio had reached Havana, and reinforcements had been sent to Gálvez. The Spanish ships carried a total of 1,700 sailors and 1,600 soldiers, bringing the total Spanish force at Pensacola to 8,000 men. Solano decided to remain to assist Gálvez after the disembarkation of the troops, and the two men worked closely together. From the end of April to the beginning of May, the artillery positions of the Spanish were strengthened, making trenches and tunnels closer and closer, and causing greater damage to the British defenses.

On April 24 a third Choctaw attack caught the Spanish by surprise. Five Spanish were wounded, including O’Neill's cousin, Sublieutenant Felipe O'Reilly. Two days later, soldiers from the Queen's Redoubt attacked Spanish positions but were driven back by O'Neill's scouts.

On April 30, the Spanish batteries opened fire, signalling the start of the full-scale attack on Pensacola. However, the gulf was experiencing tempestuous storms, and a hurricane struck the Spanish ships on May 5 and 6. The Spanish fleet had to be withdrawn, for fear the seas would wreck the ships on the shore. The army remained to continue the siege, even though the trenches were flooded. Gálvez issued them a daily ration of brandy to keep up their spirits.

In early May, Gálvez was surprised to receive chiefs of the Tallapoosa Creeks, who came offering to supply the Spanish army with meat. Gálvez arranged the purchase of beef cattle from them and also requested that they appeal to the British-allied Creeks and Choctaws to cease their attacks. On May 8, a howitzer shell struck the magazine in Fort Crescent, exploding it and sending black smoke billowing. Fifty-seven British troops were killed by the devastating blast, and Ezpeleta quickly led the light infantry in a charge to take the stricken fort. The Spanish moved howitzers and cannons into what remained of it and opened fire on the next two British forts. Pensacola's defenders returned fired from Fort George but were soon overwhelmed by the massive Spanish firepower.

On May 10, realizing his final line of fortification could not survive the barrage General John Campbell reluctantly surrendered Fort George and Prince of Wales Redoubt. More than 1,100 British and colonial troops were taken prisoner, and 200 casualties were sustained. The Spanish army lost 74 dead, with another 198 wounded.

Gálvez personally accepted the surrender of General John Campbell, ending British sovereignty in West Florida after signing the capitulation. The Spanish fleet left Pensacola for Havana on June 1 to prepare assaults on the remaining British possessions in the Caribbean. Gálvez appointed O'Neill the Spanish governor of West Florida, and his Hibernia Regiment departed with the fleet.

== Aftermath ==
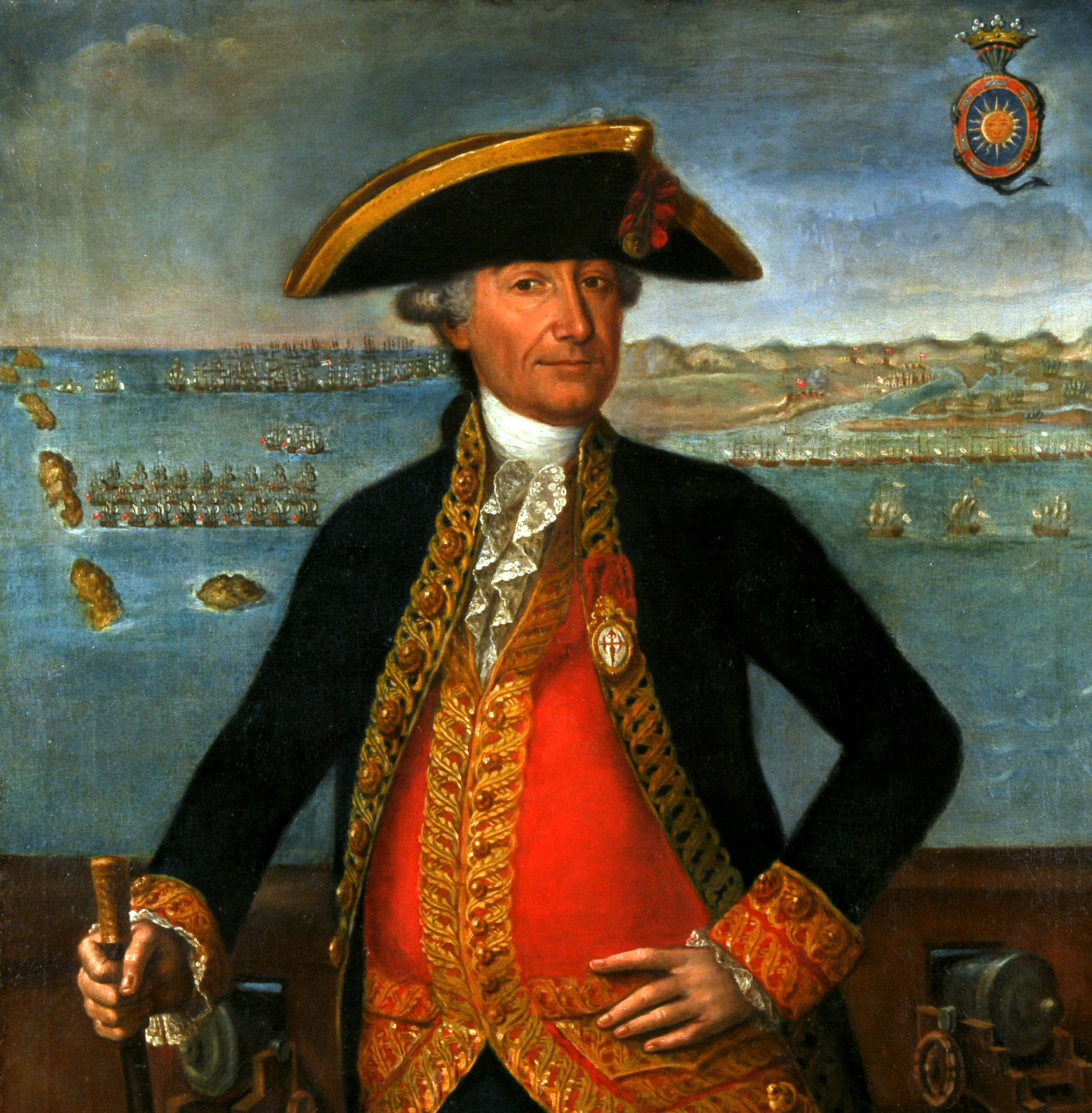
José Solano y Bote in front of Santa Rosa Bay coming to the rescue of General Gálvez

The terms of capitulation included the entirety of West Florida, the British garrison, large quantities of war materiel and supplies, and one British sloop of war. Gálvez had the batteries and Fort Barrancas Coloradas moved nearer to the bay's entrance, and placed a battery on Santa Rosa Island against British attempts to recapture Pensacola.

The Tallapoosa Muscogee Creek mission during the siege was probably connected with or even ordered by Alexander McGillivray, a mixed-race Creek trader. Although he was a Loyalist and held a British commission as a colonel, he was a longtime opponent of American colonial intrusions on Creek land. Raised as a Creek, though well educated in South Carolina, McGillivray was viewed by many Creeks as their leader. He supplied the British in Pensacola and had organized the British Muskogee Creek contingents who fought alongside the Choctaws. He would become principal chief of the Upper Creeks in 1783, who lived on the Tallapoosa River at Little Tallassee (near today's Montgomery, Alabama). His support for Spain later resulted in the 1784 Treaty of Pensacola, in which Spain guaranteed to respect Creek territory, in return for a Creek promise to stop raiding their neighbors and disrupting trade. McGillivray personally negotiated the treaty and spent the rest of his life in Pensacola.

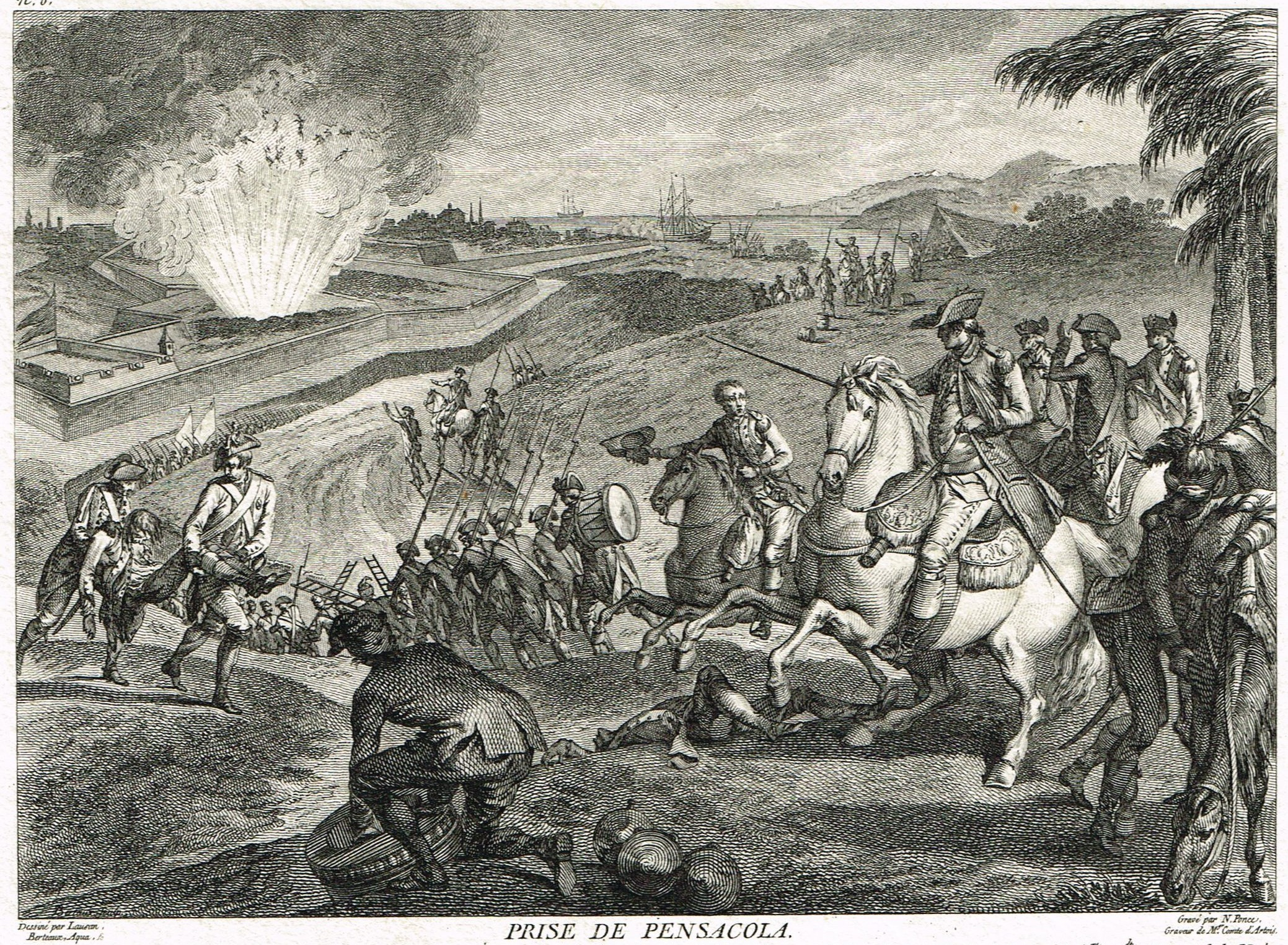
A 1783 engraving depicting the exploding magazine

Gálvez and his army were welcomed as heroes on their arrival in Havana on May 30. King Charles III promoted Gálvez to lieutenant general, and he was made governor of both West Florida and Louisiana. The royal commendation stated that since Gálvez alone forced the entrance to the bay, he could place on his coat of arms the words Yo Solo (literally, "me alone").

Bote was later recognized by King Charles for coming to aid Gálvez with the title Marques del Socorro. A painting of Solano hanging in the Museo Naval de Madrid shows him with Santa Rosa Bay in the background. A British flag captured at Pensacola is displayed at the Museum of the Army in Toledo.

== Bibliography ==
- Caughey, John W.; et al. (Foreword by Jack D.L. Holmes) (1998) [1934]. Bernardo de Gálvez in Louisiana 1776-1783 (3rd ed.). Gretna: Pelican Publishing Company. ISBN 1-56554-517-6. OCLC 43846103.
- Chartrand, René; et al. (Illustrations by Donato Spedaliere) (2006). The Spanish Main 1492–1800. Osprey Publishing. ISBN 978-1846030055.
- Chávez, Thomas E (2003) [2002]. Spain and the Independence of the United States: An Intrinsic Gift (2nd ed.). Albuquerque, New Mexico, United States: University of New Mexico Press. ISBN 9780826327949 – via Google Books.
- Davis Paul K. Besieged: 100 great sieges from Jericho to Sarajevo, Oxford University Press, USA ISBN 0-19-521930-9
- Dupuy, R. Ernest; Hammerman, Gay; Hayes, Grace P. (1977). The American Revolution: A Global War. New York City, New York, United States: David McKay Publications. ISBN 9780679506485. LCCN 76013151. OCLC 02597513.
- Gálvez, Bernardo (1781). Diario de las operaciones de la expedicion contra la Plaza de Panzacola concluida por las Armas de S. M. Católica, baxo las órdenes del mariscal de campo. Mexico.
- Kaufmann, J.E.; Kaufmann, H.W.; et al. (Illustrations by Tomasz Idzikowski) (2004) [2004]. Fortress America: The forts that defended America, 1600 to the present. Cambridge, Massachusetts, United States: Da Capo Press. ISBN 9780306812941. LCCN 2005280582. OCLC 56912995 – via Archive.org.
- Kuethe, Allan J. (1986). Cuba, 1753-1815: Crown, Military, and Society. Knoxville, Tennessee, United States: University of Tennessee Press. ISBN 0-87049-487-2. LCCN 85017844 – via Archive.org.
- Marley, David F. (2005). Historic Cities of the Americas: An Illustrated Encyclopedia. Vol. 2. Santa Barbara, California, United States: ABC-CLIO. ISBN 978-1-57607-027-7 – via Google Books.
- Mays, Terry M. (2009). Historical Dictionary of the American Revolution Volume 39 of Historical Dictionaries of War, Revolution, and Civil Unrest. Scarecrow Press. ISBN 9780810875036.
- Martín-Merás, Luisa (2007). "The Capture of Pensacola through Maps, 1781" in Legacy: Spain and the United States in the Age of Independence, 1763-1848. Washington, DC: Smithsonian Institution. ISBN 978-84-95146-36-6.
- Mississippi Valley Historical Association (1915). Proceedings of the Mississippi Valley Historical Association, Volume 8. Cedar Rapids, IA: Torch Press. OCLC 1644027.
- Mitchell, Barbara A. (September 22, 2010). "America's Spanish Savior: Bernardo de Gálvez marches to rescue the colonies". MHQ: The Quarterly Journal of Military History. New York City, New York, United States: Historynet LLC/World History Group: 98–104. ISSN 1040-5992. OCLC 18462176. Archived from the original on January 25, 2022 – via HistoryNet.
- Reparaz, Carmen (1986). Yo Solo : Bernardo de Gálvez y la toma de Panzacola en 1781. Barcelona: Ediciones del Serval S.A. ISBN 84-7628-012-2.
