= Pentagon Barracks =

- U.S. National Register of Historic Places
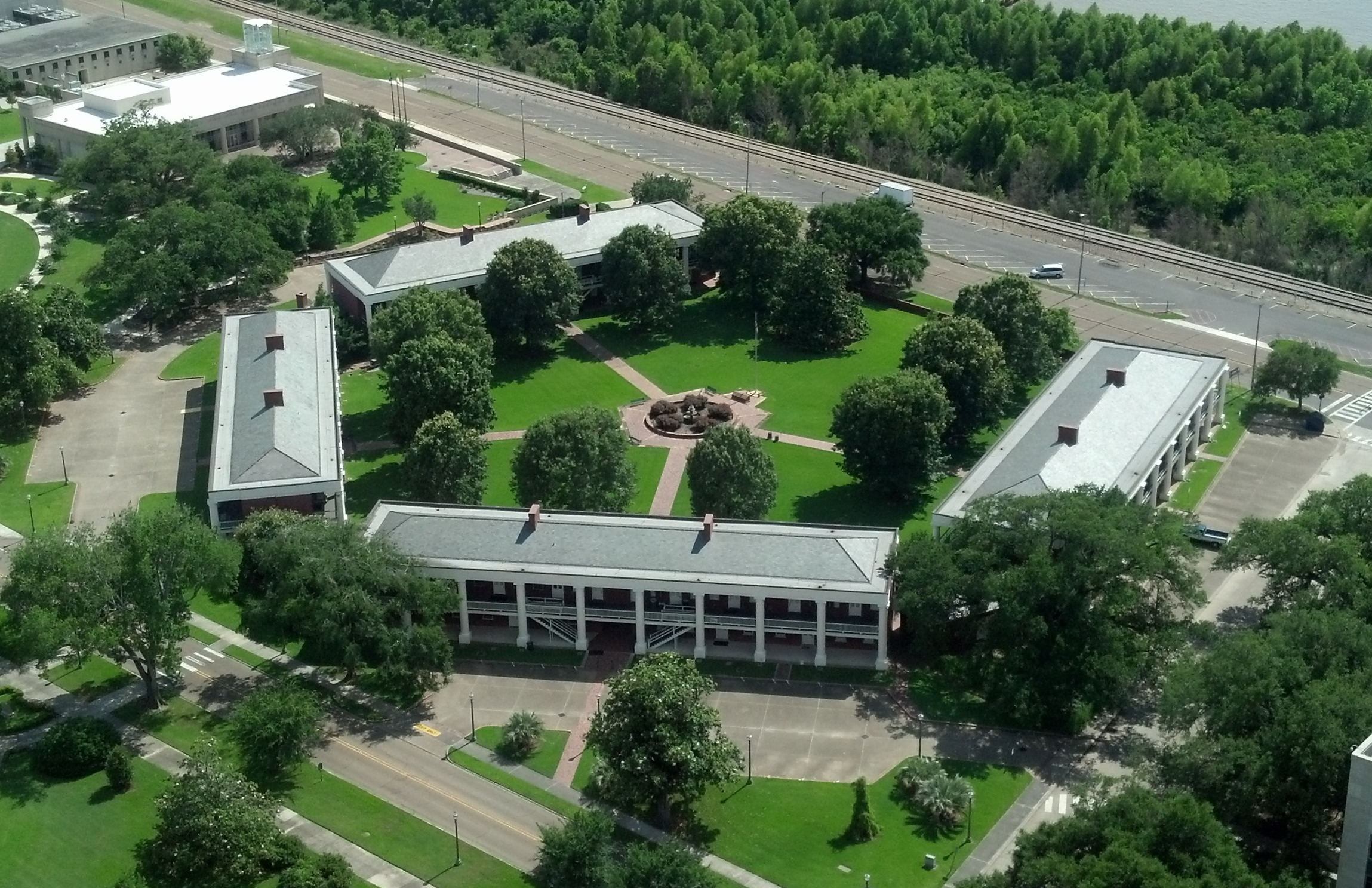
- Pentagon Barracks in 2013

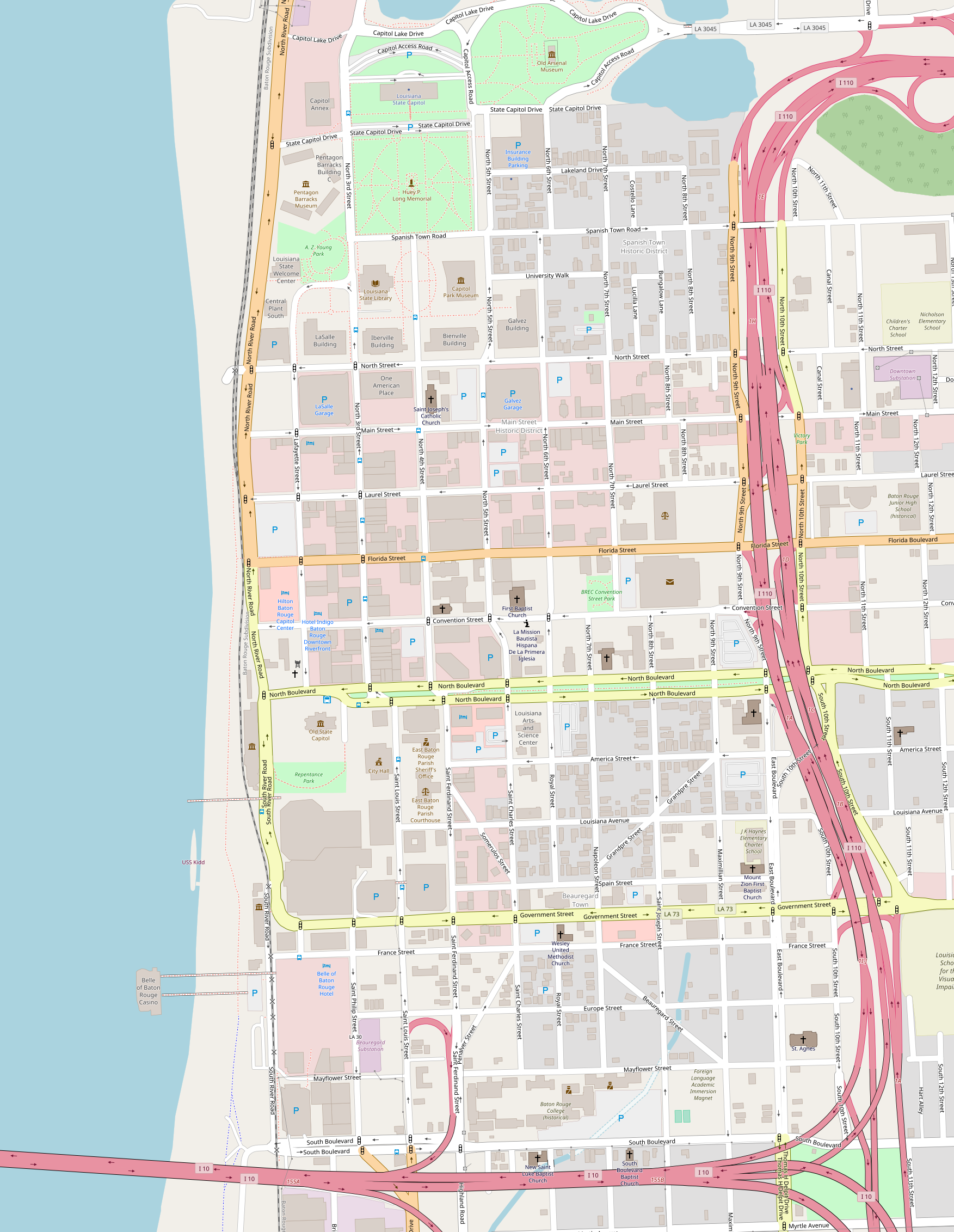
- Location within Baton Rouge Downtown
- Location: Corner of State Capitol Drive and River Road, Baton Rouge, Louisiana
- Coordinates: 30°27′20″N 91°11′22″W
- Area: 5.75 acres (2.33 ha)
- Built: 1819-1825
- Built by: John Hill; Capt. Thomas S. Rodgers; Capt. R. D. Richardson
- Architect: Capt. James Gadsden
- NRHP reference No.: 73000863
- Added to NRHP: July 26, 1973

The Pentagon Barracks, also known as the Old United States Barracks, is a complex of buildings located at the corner of State Capitol Drive and River Road in Baton Rouge, Louisiana, in the grounds of the state capitol. The site was used by the Spanish, French, British, Confederate States Army, and United States Army and was part of the short-lived Republic of West Florida. During its use as a military post the site has been visited by such notable figures as Zachary Taylor, Lafayette, Robert E. Lee, George Custer, Jefferson Davis, and Abraham Lincoln.

== French, British and Spanish fort ==
Pierre Le Moyne d'Iberville visited the area circa 1700. France retained the Baton Rouge site until the British took control in 1763.

In 1779, during the American Revolutionary War, the British erected a dirt Fort New Richmond on the banks of the Mississippi River. Bernardo de Gálvez, colonial governor of Louisiana (New Spain), arrived on 20 September 1779 and found three hundred British troops garrisoning Fort New Richmond. In the Battle of Baton Rouge (1779), engineers under Spanish Governor Gálvez quickly constructed a siege line, enabling the Spanish troops to shell Fort Richmond; the British surrendered the next day. The Spanish garrisoned the fortification and renamedit as Fort San Carlos.

The reconstruction of the fort can be seen in many plans at the Spanish National Archives

Fort San Carlos 03-06-1799

Barracks, kitchen and warehouse circa 1788

House for the Commander circa 1788

Wooden bridge 1796

Fort San Carlos and surrounding areas with new settlements 1804

== Republic of West Florida ==
American and remaining British settlers in Louisiana resisted Spanish control and rebelled in 1810 to establish the Republic of West Florida. They flew their Bonnie Blue Flag over Fort San Carlos throughout the republic's short three-month life. The Republic surrendered the city of Baton Rouge to United States authorities on December 10, 1810.

== U. S. military post at Baton Rouge ==
American forces renamed the fort Post at Baton Rouge. The Post at Baton Rouge served as the assembly point for American troops going to the Creek War in 1813-14 and to the Battle of New Orleans in 1814-15. The Army built the Baton Rouge Barracks just north of the Post at Baton Rouge and in 1819 demolished the former Fort San Carlos.

United States Army Captain James Gadsden designed the Baton Rouge Barracks and took charge of their construction from 1819 to 1825. The soldiers completed four two-story brick buildings, forming four sides of a regular pentagon, by 1825, hence the nickname "Pentagon Barracks." They also built a commissary-warehouse building, forming the fifth side of the pentagon, in 1821, but tore down this defective building within a few months due to faulty construction. The Pentagon Barracks could house one thousand troops.

The Army in 1825 established a large adjacent Baton Rouge Arsenal and Ordnance Depot to serve the then-Southwestern United States.

== American Civil War ==
The United States Army occupied the Baton Rouge Barracks and Arsenal until January 1861, when the State of Louisiana seized the post and turned the operation of the arsenal over to the Confederate States of America. The Confederacy held Baton Rouge until its evacuation during the capture of New Orleans in April 1862. Union troops took back and reoccupied the Baton Rouge complex in May 1862.

The Confederates attempted unsuccessfully to retake Baton Rouge in the Battle of Baton Rouge (1862). Union authorities renamed the Barracks and Arsenal as Fort Williams after Union General Thomas Williams, who was killed in the battle. Union soldiers built earthworks to protect the complex, incorporating an old Indian mound into the defenses.

== Louisiana State University ==
Monument of Sigma Iota's birthplace on the former LSU Campus

In 1884, the General Assembly of Louisiana passed a resolution allocating the full usage of the buildings and grounds of the Pentagon Barracks to Louisiana State University. The University gained full possession of the grounds in 1886 and the buildings were used as dormitories for the students. The grounds were used by LSU until the university moved to its current location in 1926.

Sigma Iota fraternity was founded there on February 27, 1903 as a secret society for Spanish-American students under the name La Estrella de Oro, which would later be renamed to La Colonia Hispano-Americana the following year, and then subsequently once more to the Sociedad Hispano-Americana in December 1904.

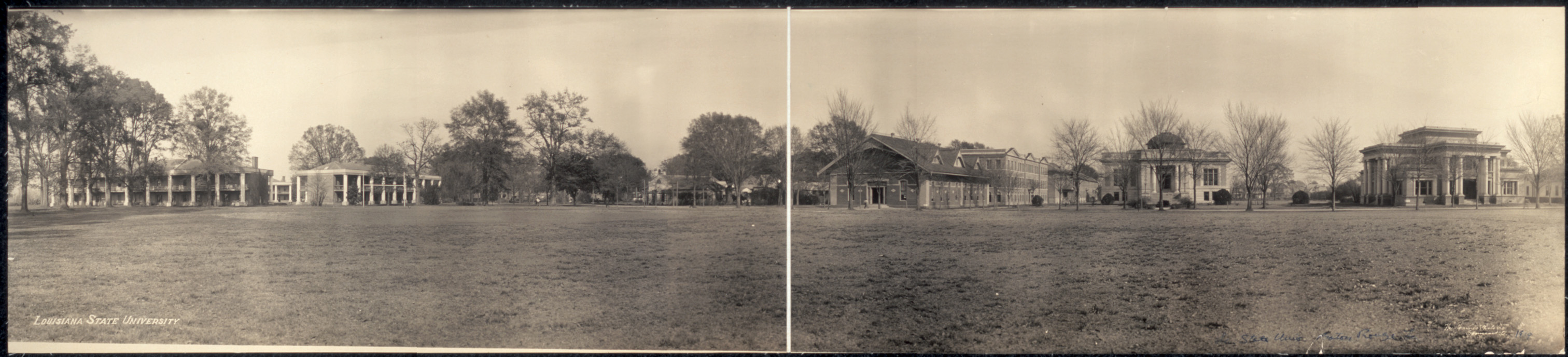
The Pentagon Barracks (left) in 1909 in a panorama of what was then the campus of Louisiana State University

== Modern use ==
In 1951, ownership of the Barracks was transferred to the State of Louisiana and on July 26, 1973, the buildings were placed on the National Register of Historic Places. The Pentagon Barracks still houses the offices of the lieutenant governor and private apartments for state legislators.

== See also ==
- History of Louisiana
- National Register of Historic Places listings in East Baton Rouge Parish, Louisiana
