= Fort New Richmond =

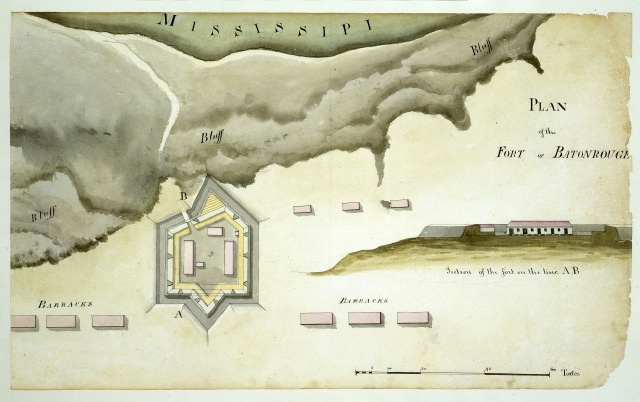

- Location within Louisiana

General information
- Location: Baton Rouge, Louisiana, United States
- Coordinates: 30.4542°N 91.1884°W
- Completed: 1779

Technical details
- Structural system: Earthen

Fort New Richmond was built by the British in 1779 on the east bank of the Mississippi River in what was later to become Baton Rouge, Louisiana. The Spanish took control of the fort in 1779 and renamed it Fort San Carlos.

== Revolutionary War ==
The fort was built by Lieutenant-Colonel Alexander Dickson (British Army commander of the Baton Rouge area) after he discovered that Fort Bute (built in 1765) was indefensible against cannon. The fort at Baton Rouge was built on the Watt's and Flower's plantations and was completed during the six weeks preceding hostilities in the area during the American Revolutionary War. The fort consisted of a ditch eighteen feet wide and nine feet deep surrounding an earthen wall with palisades in the form of chevaux de frise. It was armed with thirteen cannon, 400 British Army troops from the 16th and 60th Regiments of Foot, a company of grenadiers from Waldeck, and roughly 150 Loyalist militiaman.

The fort was captured on September 21, 1779, when Bernardo de Gálvez, the colonial Governor of Spanish Louisiana, after capturing Fort Bute led his force of approximately 1,000 men (reduced by the hardships of the march from New Orleans) against Baton Rouge. The surrender of Fort New Richmond eliminated the presence of British forces in the Mississippi River area.

== See also ==
- Battle of Baton Rouge (1779)
- Capture of Fort Bute
- Pentagon Barracks
- Fort Bute

== Bibliography ==
- Meyers, Rose (1976). A history of Baton Rouge, 1699-1812. Baton Rouge: Published for the Baton Rouge Bicentennial Corp. by the Louisiana State University Press. ISBN 0-8071-0175-3.
