= Capture of Fort Bute =

1779 battle

- Part of the Gulf Coast campaign
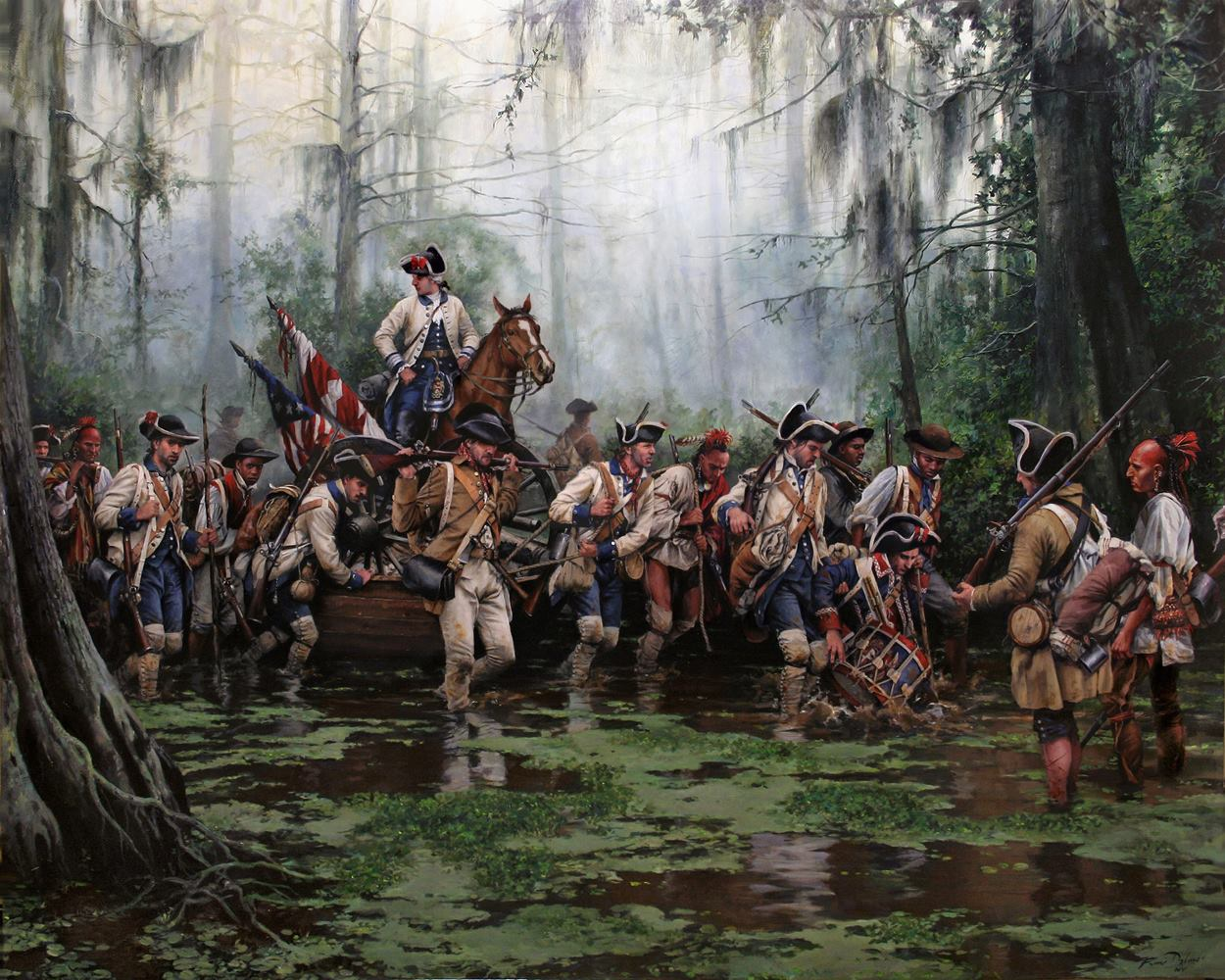
- La Marcha de Gálvez by Augusto Ferrer-Dalmau
| Date | 7 September 1779 |
| Location | Fort Bute, West Florida (present-day East Baton Rouge Parish, Louisiana) |
| Result | Spanish victory |

Belligerents
| Spain | Great Britain: Waldeck-Pyrmont |

Commanders and leaders
| (Spanish Empire) Col. Bernardo de Gálvez | Capt. Georg von Haake (surrendered) |

Strength
| 1,430 regulars, militia, & natives | 23 Waldecker grenadiers |

Casualties and losses
| None | 1 killed 16 captured |

The capture of Fort Bute, also known as the Battle of Manchac Post, signalled the opening of Spanish intervention in the American Revolutionary War on the side of France and the United States. Mustering an ad hoc army of Spanish regulars, Acadian militia, and native levies under Gilbert Antoine de St. Maxent, Bernardo de Gálvez, the Governor of Spanish Louisiana stormed and captured the small British frontier post on Bayou Manchac on September 7, 1779.

== Background ==
Spain's formal declaration of war against Britain was made by King Charles III on May 8, 1779. This declaration was followed by another on July 8 that authorized his colonial subjects to engage in hostilities against the British in North America. Many confuse this as Spain joining the American Revolutionary War, but its declaration of war against the British was a separate war with different primary objectives, but secondarily did support the Americans in their efforts towards independence.

When Bernardo de Gálvez, the colonial Governor of Spanish Louisiana, received word of this on July 21, he immediately began to secretly plan offensive operations. Gálvez, who had been planning for the possibility of war since April, intercepted communications from the British at Pensacola indicating that the British were planning a surprise attack on New Orleans; he decided to launch his own attack first. To that end, he concealed from the public his receipt of the second proclamation.

== Great Britain ==
West Florida map (1767)

Fort Bute (30°19′25″N 91°08′13″W) was located on Bayou Manchac, about 115 miles (185 km) up the Mississippi River from New Orleans, on the far western border of British West Florida. Lieutenant Colonel Alexander Dickson was charged with the defense of the Baton Rouge district, which included Fort Bute, Baton Rouge, and Fort Panmure (modern Natchez, Mississippi). The British had begun sending larger numbers of troops to the area following George Rogers Clark's capture of Vincennes, which had exposed the weak British defenses in the area. At Dickson's disposal in August 1779 were 400 regulars, including companies from the 16th and 60th Regiments, a recently arrived company of grenadiers from Waldeck-Pyrmont, and about 150 Loyalist militia.

Fort Bute was an older stockade fort built in 1766. It was in such disrepair that Dickson judged it to be indefensible. When Dickson received word of Spanish movements, he withdrew most of his forces to Baton Rouge and Panmure, leaving a small garrison of 20 Waldeckers under Captain von Haake behind.

== Spain ==
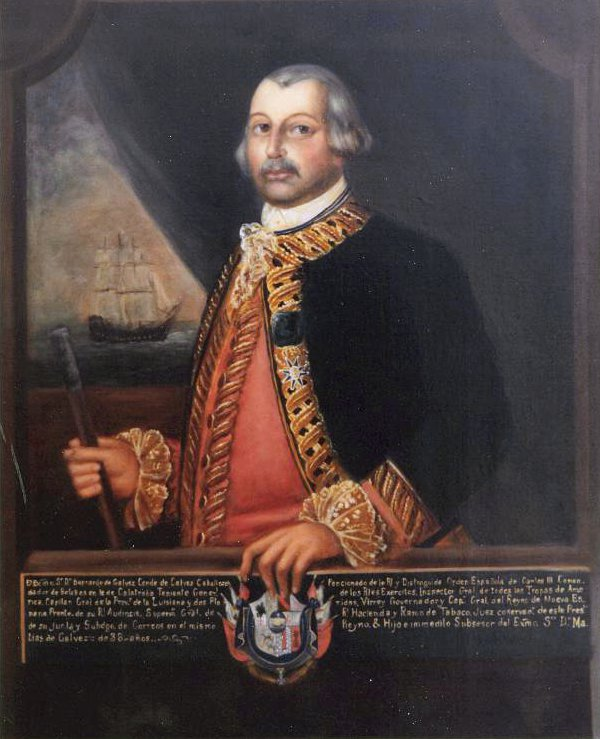
Bernardo de Gálvez

Gálvez originally planned to leave New Orleans on August 20. However, a hurricane on August 18 swept over the town, sinking most of his fleet and destroying provisions. Undeterred, Gálvez rallied the support of the colony and on August 27 set out by land toward Baton Rouge, using as an explanation for the movement the need to defend Spanish Louisiana from an expected British attack. The force departing New Orleans consisted of 520 regulars, of whom about two-thirds were recent recruits, 60 militiamen, 80 free men of color, and ten American volunteers headed by Oliver Pollock. As they marched upriver, the force grew by another 600 men, from Indians to Acadians. At its peak, the force numbered over 1,400; but this number was reduced, due to the hardships of the march, by several hundred before they reached Fort Bute.

When the force neared Fort Bute on September 6, Gálvez informed them of the Spanish war declaration and the true purpose of their mission, eliciting cheers from the men. At dawn the next day they attacked the fort, and after a brief skirmish in which one German was killed, most of the garrison surrendered. The six who escaped capture made their way to Baton Rouge to notify Dickson.

== Aftermath ==
Gálvez remained at Fort Bute for six days, giving his men time to rest, before moving on to Baton Rouge, which fell after a short siege on September 21. The terms of capitulation agreed to by Dickson at Baton Rouge secured for Gálvez the surrender of the remaining British outposts on the Mississippi River.

Gálvez then returned to New Orleans and began planning a campaign against Mobile and Pensacola, the remaining British strongholds in West Florida.

== See also ==
- List of American Revolutionary War battles

== Bibliography ==
- Deiler, John Hanno (1909). The Settlement of the German Coast of Louisiana and the Creoles of German Descent, Volume 8. Philadelphia: American Germanica Press. OCLC 3557373.
- Gayarré, Charles (1867). History of Louisiana : The Spanish domination, Volume 3. New York: Widdleton. OCLC 1855106.
- Kaufmann, J. E.; Idzikowski, Tomasz (2004). Fortress America: the forts that defended America, 1600 to the present. Cambridge, MA: Da Capo Press. ISBN 978-0-306-81294-1. OCLC 56912995.
- Nester, William R (2004). The frontier war for American independence. Mechanicsburg, PA: Stackpole Books. ISBN 978-0-8117-0077-1. OCLC 52963301.
