= Oliver Pollock =

American businessman (1737–1823)

- Born: 1737; Bready, County Tyrone, Kingdom of Ireland
- Died: December 17, 1823 (aged 85–86); Pinckneyville, Mississippi, U.S.
- Occupations: Merchant, Financier
- Known for: Financing the American Revolutionary War, Creating the U.S. dollar sign ($)
- Spouse: Margaret O'Brien
- Children: 7

Oliver Pollock (1737, Bready, County Tyrone, Northern Ireland – December 17, 1823, Pinckneyville, Mississippi) was a merchant and financier of the American Revolutionary War, of which he has long been considered a historically undervalued figure. He is often credited with inventing the U.S. Dollar sign in 1778.

== Early life ==
Pollock sailed to North America at the age of 23 in 1760 with his father from his native Ireland to Philadelphia. He settled in Cumberland County, Pennsylvania. Two years later, he began his career as a merchant, trading from port-to-port with the Spaniards in the West Indies, and was headquartered in Havana, Cuba. It was here that he became close with the Governor-General Alejandro O'Reilly. O'Reilly was later made the Governor of Louisiana by the King of Spain.

Pollock began working as a merchant in New Orleans and, through his relationship with O'Reilly, was favorably received by Spanish Louisiana's officials, who granted him free trade within the city. He became the most successful businessman in the city as a result of the scarcity of provisions at the time, bringing in a desperately needed shipment of flour. However instead of taking advantage of the colonists, Pollock sold the flour for half the going price. In 1770 he married Margaret O'Brien of New Orleans, with whom he had eight children before her death in 1799.

By the outbreak of the American Revolutionary War, Pollock had become very wealthy and had significant political influence. Pollock stayed in New Orleans for eight years and also worked as a plantation owner and selling land in Baton Rouge.

== Revolutionary War period ==
Oliver Pollock, a friend of the governor of Louisiana, served in April of 1776 as a secret mediator between Luis de Unzaga and the Founding Fathers Patrick Henry and Robert Morris in order to bring the first secret aids for the birth of the United States of America. In 1777 he was appointed "commercial agent of the United States at New Orleans", making him the representative of the colonies in the city. He used his fortune to finance American operations in the west, and the successful campaign of General George Rogers Clark in Illinois 1778 occurred with his financial support. In the same year, he borrowed $70,000 from Spanish Louisiana's Governor Bernardo de Gálvez, but the financial needs of the country at the time left him with a loss. In September of that year, Pollock introduced Col. David Rogers and Capt. Robert Benham to the Governor. Rogers was delivering an important letter from Patrick Henry from Virginia. This meeting led to Spain joining the war against England.

Pollock served as Gálvez's aide-de-camp during the Spanish campaign against the British that began with the Spanish declaration of war in June 1779. Gálvez and the Spanish troops swept through the future states of Louisiana, Alabama, and Florida, defeating the British with the capture of Fort Bute and campaigning through the victorious siege of Pensacola in 1781. Pollock's diplomacy assisted in the surrender of Fort Panmure (future Natchez, Mississippi).

During the capture of Fort Bute, he is followed by 2 US officers and 7 volunteers.

In 1783 he was appointed an agent by the United States in Havana, where he would be imprisoned for his debts a year later, amounting to $150,000. In 1785 he was released on parole and returned to Philadelphia, where he met a sympathetic Robert Morris, another financier of the war who had also incurred debts as a result. Morris however had collected a sum of money to buy Pollock time from his debtors. Both Congress and the state of Virginia had continually refused to clear his debts from the war, until 1791 when Congress passed an act discharging them, but in the same year he would return in poverty to Cumberland County.

== Later life ==
Pollock ran for Congress in Pennsylvania's 4th congressional district twice. The first time in 1804 he was not elected despite winning the popular vote in Cumberland County. He was initially nominated for the same seat again in 1806, but dropped out in favor of his friend, Robert Whitehill, who wound up being elected. In 1800 he again found himself in debt, but within a few years had accumulated property. He owned plantation land in West Feliciana Parish, Louisiana including Trudeau House. He remarried in 1805, to Winifred Deady; they had no children. He finally retired in 1819 to Pinckneyville, Mississippi to the home of his daughter Mary, wife of Dr. Samuel Robinson, dying in 1823. His burial site is located in the family cemetery there, although his portraits and personal effects were lost in a fire during the Civil War.

== Legacy ==
In addition to his unintended influence on the uptake of the dollar sign to represent the US dollar, Pollock is depicted in a large public sculpture in downtown Baton Rouge, Louisiana. His life is also commemorated on a plaque nearby.
