= Fort Bute =

British colonial fort in Louisiana

- British West Florida in 1767

- Location of Fort Bute
- 30°19′25″N 91°8′13″W
- Location: British West Florida, now East Baton Rouge Parish, Louisiana

History
- Built: 1776
- Built by: Kingdom of Great Britain
- Demolished: 1779
- Event(s): Capture of Fort Bute; Gulf Coast campaign

Fort Bute (1766–1779) was a colonial fort built by the British in 1766 to protect the confluence of Bayou Manchac with the Mississippi River and was named in honor of the Earl of Bute. Fort Bute was located on Bayou Manchac, about 115 miles (185 km) up the Mississippi River from New Orleans, on the far western border of British West Florida. It was one of the three outposts maintained by the British in the lower Mississippi along with Fort Panmure and the Baton Rouge outpost.

== Passage to Mobile ==
On October 20, 1763, Major Robert Farmar of the 34th Regiment and commander of His Britannic Majesty's troops declared that all of the inhabitants of West Florida were subjects of England. The British led by Colonel Taylor began clearing out the Iberville River and building a path from British West Florida to the "14th British colony" of Mobile. Captain James Campbell along with 50 African slaves constructed a channel to the Mississippi River. It was during this time that Farmar planned to build Fort Bute for protecting the workers and local settlers.

== Construction ==
In 1765 construction materials and engineer Archibald Robertson from Pensacola arrived in Bayou Manchac. Robertson supervised the planning and construction of Fort Bute. The fort consisted of a single blockhouse surrounded by a stockade. The fort was designed to hold up to 200 men with a single officers quarters.

== Capture ==
On September 3, 1779, Colonel Alexander Dickson removed nearly all the troops from the fort, leaving only 23 soldiers. The troops were ordered to march to the Baton Rouge outpost. Bernardo de Gálvez, the governor of Spanish Louisiana and commander of the troops of the Catholic Majesty, gathered 1,427 militiamen consisting of 600 multinational settlers, 160 Native Americans, and 667 Spanish infantrymen. Gálvez slowly marched his troops towards Bayou Manchac through the muddy swamp at nine miles each day. The Spanish arrived at Fort Bute 11 days after beginning the march.

At dawn on September 7 the Spanish captured Fort Bute with no casualties. One British captain, one lieutenant, and 18 soldiers were taken prisoner. Three British soldiers ran away from the battle and fled towards Baton Rouge.
