= Bayou Manchac =

Location
- Country: United States
- State: Louisiana
- Parishes: East Baton Rouge; Ascension

Physical characteristics
- Source
  - location: Near the Mississippi River south of Baton Rouge
  - coordinates: 30°19′01″N 91°08′16″W
- Mouth: Amite River
  - coordinates: 30°20′44″N 90°53′31″W
- Length: 18 miles (29 km)

Bayou Manchac is an 18-mile-long (29 km) bayou in southeast Louisiana, USA. First called the Iberville River ("rivière d'Iberville") by its French discoverers, the bayou was once a very important waterway linking the Mississippi River (west end) to the Amite River (east end). East Baton Rouge Parish lies on its northern side, while its southern side is divided between Ascension Parish (to the east) and Iberville Parish (to the west). The large unincorporated community of Prairieville and the city of St. Gabriel both lie on its southern side.

== Etymology ==
Dr John R. Swanton, a linguist who worked with Native American languages, suggested that the name Manchac is derived from Imashaka, which is a Choctaw word meaning "the rear entrance." An early Choctaw language dictionary written by Cyrus Byington defines the word im as a preposition meaning "place" and ashaka meaning "the back side or rear".

== Exploration ==
In March 1699, Pierre Le Moyne d'Iberville made his way up the Mississippi and came to the area that is now the city of Baton Rouge. He wished to find a quick way back to the Gulf of Mexico, where his ships were moored at Ship Island. On March 26, 1699, the chief of the Bayogoula tribe, who had accompanied him to the future site of Baton Rouge, showed him the bayou that the Bayogoula used to travel between the present-day Mississippi Gulf Coast and their village.

== Fort Bute ==
In 1764, the British established a trading post on the Iberville River and called it Fort Bute at Manchac. The British traded with boats traveling down the Mississippi and encouraged trading at Manchac rather than with the Spanish farther down at New Orleans. The fort at Bayou Manchac was a strategic position for the British and was positioned to compete with Spain for the fur trade, valued at that time at 100,000 pounds sterling annually.

== San Gabriel de Manchac ==
Soon after the British built Fort Bute, the Spanish responded by building a trading post on the opposite side of the river. On September 28, 1766, an English ship arrived in New Orleans from Maryland carrying 224 exiled Acadians. The Spanish Governor Antonio de Ulloa at the Isle of Orleans gave them supplies, and they settled around San Gabriel de Manchac.

For about three months, from April 30 to August 4, 1812, Bayou Manchac was the northern border of eastern Louisiana, until the addition of the Florida Parishes was approved by the state legislature.

== Industrial use and today ==
Bayou Manchac became one of the most important waterways of southeastern Louisiana. It served the vital role of linking Baton Rouge to Lake Pontchartrain via the Amite River and Lake Maurepas. Through time, as ships became larger and faster, Bayou Manchac was too small to support modern traffic. In the 20th century, when the Mississippi River levees were built, Bayou Manchac was cut off from the river, and later the upper sections dried out or were cut off by roads. Now the bayou is only useful for drainage and recreation, but the area is still regarded by those who live in the vicinity as one of Louisiana's most beautiful examples of nature.

== See also ==
- List of rivers of Louisiana

== Sources ==
Sternberg, Mary Ann (2007). Winding Through Time: The Forgotten History and Present-Day Peril of Bayou Manchac. Louisiana State University Press. ISBN 978-0-8071-3253-1.
