= Battle of Baton Rouge (1779) =

1779 Spanish victory in the American Revolutionary War

- Part of the Gulf Coast campaign
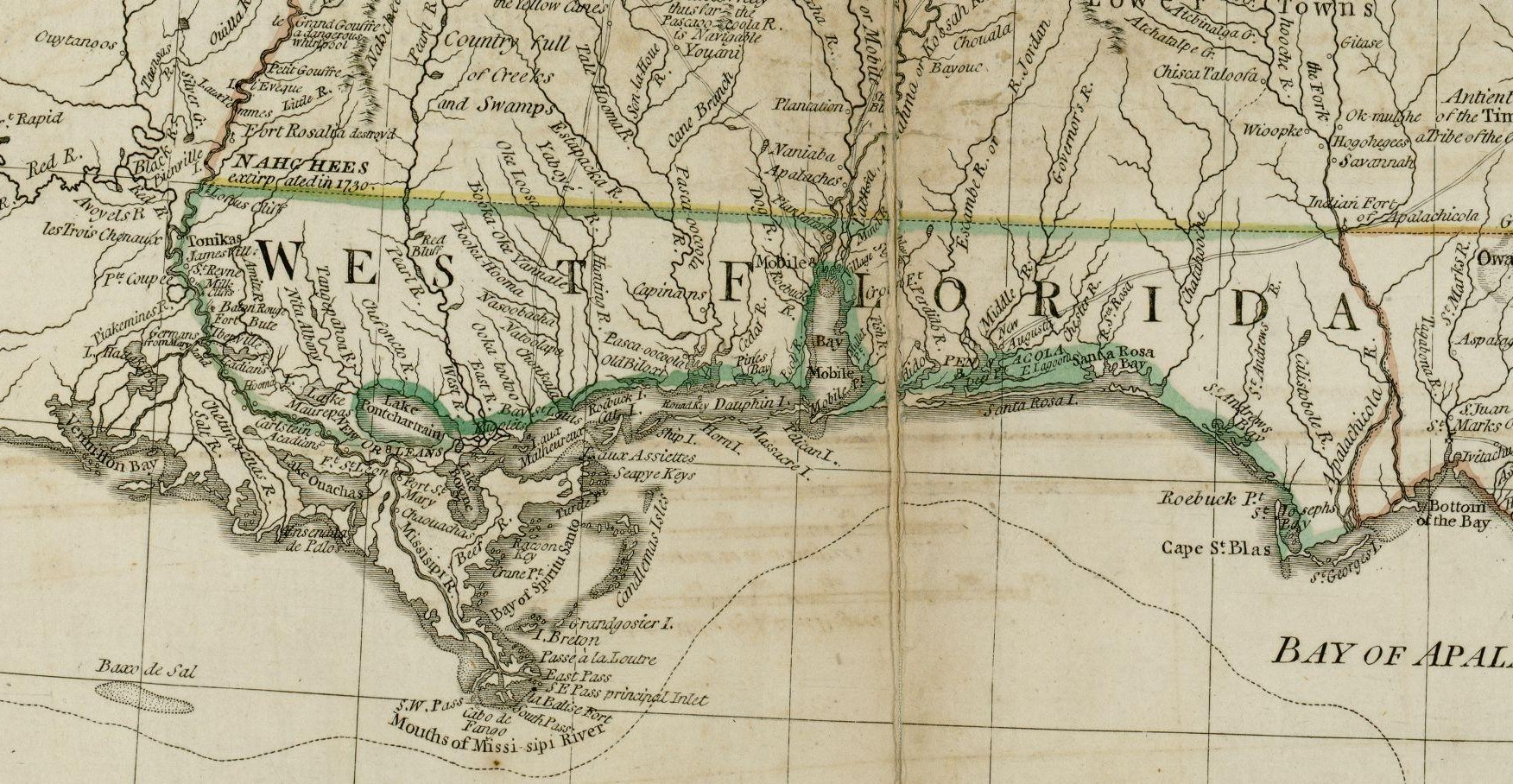
- Detail from a 1776 map showing West Florida
Date	September 12–21, 1779
Location	Fort New Richmond, West Florida (present-day Baton Rouge, Louisiana) 30.4500°N 91.1333°W
Result	Spanish victory

Belligerents
Spain	Great Britain: Waldeck-Pyrmont

Commanders and leaders
(Spanish Empire) Col. Bernardo de Gálvez	(Kingdom of Great Britain) Lieut. Col. Alexander Dickson (surrendered)

Strength
>1,400 (pre-engagement) ~400 regulars, ~400 militia (engagement estimate)	400 regulars 150 militia

Casualties and losses
9 killed 39 wounded	4 killed 2 wounded 375 captured 30 later died of wounds in captivity

The Battle of Baton Rouge was a brief siege during the Anglo-Spanish War that was decided on September 21, 1779. Fort New Richmond (present-day Baton Rouge, Louisiana) was the second British outpost to fall to Spanish arms during Bernardo de Gálvez's march into West Florida.

== Background ==
Spain officially entered the American Revolutionary War on May 8, 1779, with a formal declaration of war by King Charles III. This declaration was followed by another on July 8 that authorized his colonial subjects to engage in hostilities against the British. When Colonel Bernardo de Gálvez, the colonial Governor of Spanish Louisiana received word of this on July 21, he immediately began to plan offensive operations to take West Florida.

=== Fort Bute ===
On August 27, Gálvez set out by land toward Fort Bute, leading a force that consisted of 520 regulars, of whom about two-thirds were recent recruits, 60 militiamen, 80 free blacks and mulattoes, and ten American volunteers headed by Oliver Pollock. As they marched upriver, the force grew by another 600 men, including Indians and Acadians. At its peak, the force numbered over 1,400, but this number was reduced due to the hardships of the march by several hundred before they reached the fort.

At dawn on September 7, this force attacked Fort Bute, a decaying relic of the French and Indian War that was defended by a small force. After a brief skirmish in which one German was killed, the garrison surrendered. The six who escaped capture made their way to Baton Rouge to notify the British troops there of the fort's capture.

After several days' rest, Gálvez advanced on Baton Rouge, only 15 miles (24 km) from Fort Bute. When Gálvez arrived at Baton Rouge on September 12, he found a well-fortified town garrisoned by over 400 regular army troops and 150 militia under the overall command of Lieutenant Colonel Alexander Dickson. The troops consisted of British Army regulars from the 16th and 60th Regiments, as well as some artillerymen, and several companies of Germans from the 3rd Waldeck Regiment.

=== British defenses ===
Dickson had decided weeks earlier that Fort Bute, built in 1766 and in ruins, was not defensible, and had placed most of his troops at Baton Rouge. Beginning in July 1779, he directed the construction of Fort New Richmond. This fortification was an earthen redoubt with chevaux de frise on the outside. It was surrounded by a moat 18 feet (5.5 m) wide and 9 feet (2.7 m) deep, and fortified with thirteen cannons.

== Battle ==
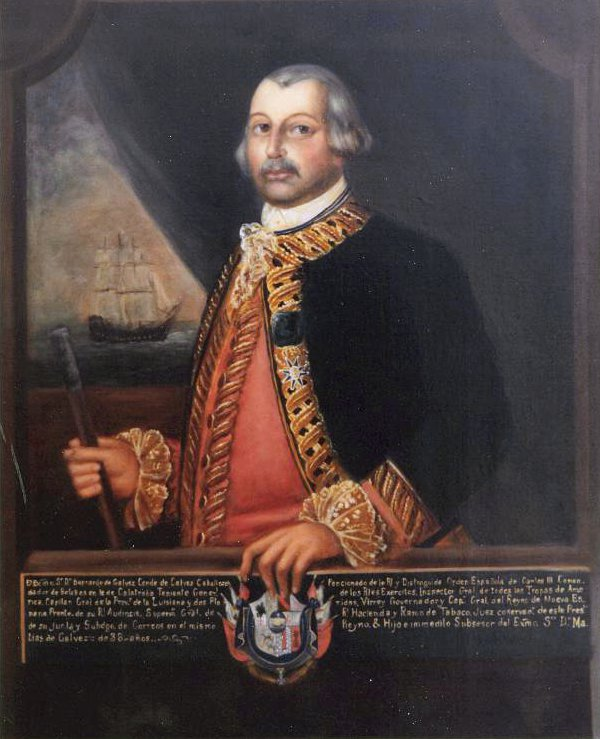
Bernardo de Gálvez

Gálvez first sent a detachment of men further up the river to break communications between Baton Rouge and British sites further upriver. Before the fort he was unable to directly advance his own artillery, so Gálvez ordered a feint to the north through a wooded area, sending a detachment of his poorly trained militia to create disturbances in the forest. The British turned and unleashed massed volleys at this body, but the Spanish forces, shielded by substantial foliage, suffered some casualties. This attack was eventually driven off. While this went on, Gálvez dug siege trenches and established secure gunpits within musket range of the fort. He placed his artillery pieces there, opening fire on the fort on September 21.

Later on the Spanish opened up with heavy artillery on the British fort. The British endured many hours of heavy mortar shelling before Dickson was offered full military surrender. Gálvez demands included the capitulation of the (80 Grenadiers of the 60th Regiment Of Foote) at Fort Panmure (modern Natchez, Mississippi), a well-fortified position that would have been difficult for Gálvez to take militarily. Dickson surrendered 375 regular troops the next day; Gálvez had Dickson's militia disarmed and sent home. Gálvez then sent a detachment of 50 men to take control of Panmure. He also dismissed his own militia companies, left a sizable garrison at Baton Rouge, and returned to New Orleans with about 50 men.

== Aftermath ==
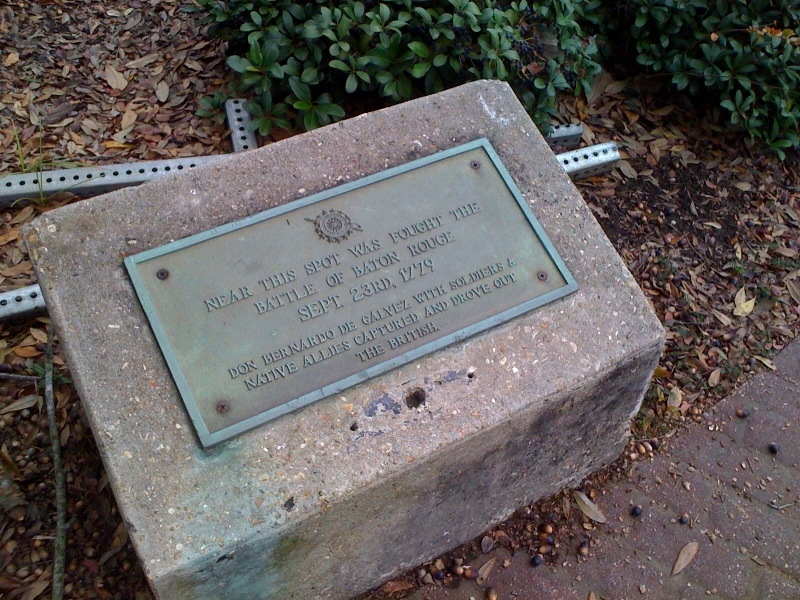
Daughters of the American Revolution commemorative marker

When informed that Dickson had surrendered Fort Panmure, its commander was irate, believing Dickson had surrendered Panmure to get better terms of surrender. Isaac Johnson, a local justice of the peace, wrote that "In the mighty battle between Governor Gálvez and Colonel Dickson, the Spaniards only lost one man and some say not one, the English lost twenty-five and the commanding officer wounded his head on his tea table".

The victory at Baton Rouge cleared the Mississippi River entirely of British forces and put the lower reaches of the river firmly under Spanish control. Within a few days of Gálvez' victory, American and Spanish privateers captured several British supply ships on Lake Pontchartrain, including the remarkable capture of one ship carrying 54 Waldecker troops and ten to twelve sailors by a sloop crewed by 14 native Louisianans.

Gálvez was promoted to brigadier general for his successful campaign, and his exploits were immortalized in the poetry of Julien Poydras. He immediately began planning an expedition against Mobile and Pensacola, the remaining British strongholds in West Florida, which would culminate in the capture of Pensacola, the West Florida capital, in 1781.

Baton Rouge remained in Spanish hands for the rest of the war, and Britain ceded both West and East Florida to Spain in the 1783 Treaty of Paris. It would not become American territory until 1821.

== Bibliography ==
- Deiler, John Hanno (1909). The Settlement of the German Coast of Louisiana and the Creoles of German Descent, Volume 8. Philadelphia: American Germanica Press. OCLC 3557373.
- Haarmann, Albert (October 1960). "The Spanish Conquest of British West Florida, 1779–1781". The Florida Historical Quarterly. 39 (2): 107–134. JSTOR 30150253.
- Haynes, Robert (1976). The Natchez District and the American Revolution. Jackson, MS: University Press of Mississippi. ISBN 978-1-60473-179-8. OCLC 235926690.
- Gayarré, Charles (1867). History of Louisiana : The Spanish Domination, Volume 3. New York: Widdleton. OCLC 1855106.
- Kaufmann, J. E.; Idzikowski, Tomasz (2004). Fortress America: the Forts that Defended America, 1600 to the Present. Cambridge, MA: Da Capo Press. ISBN 978-0-306-81294-1. OCLC 56912995.
- Nester, William R (2004). The Frontier War for American Independence. Mechanicsburg, PA: Stackpole Books. ISBN 978-0-8117-0077-1. OCLC 52963301.
