= British West Florida =

Colony of the Kingdom of Great Britain

Coordinates: 30°25′58.9″N 87°11′26.5″W

Province of West Florida
- Colony of Great Britain
- 1763–1783
- Red Ensign of Great Britain

- British West Florida in 1767
- Capital: Pensacola
- Government
- Governor
  - 1763: Augustine Prevost
  - 1770–1783: Peter Chester
- History
  - Treaty of Paris (1763): 10 February 1763
  - Peace of Paris (1783): 1783
Preceded by	Succeeded by
Louisiana (New France); Spanish Florida	Spanish West Florida

British West Florida was a colony of the Kingdom of Great Britain from 1763 until 1783, when it was ceded to Spain as part of the Peace of Paris.

British West Florida comprised parts of the modern U.S. states of Louisiana, Mississippi, Alabama and Florida. Effective British control ended in 1781 when Spain captured Pensacola. The territory subsequently became a colony of Spain, parts of which were gradually annexed piecemeal by the United States beginning in 1810.

== Creation ==
In 1762, during the Seven Years' War, a British expedition attacked and occupied Havana, the capital of Cuba. To secure the return of this valuable city, Spain agreed to cede its territory of La Florida to the victorious Great Britain under the 1763 Treaty of Paris. France ceded a large segment of New France to Great Britain, including its territory east of the Mississippi River except for Île d'Orléans, the area south of Bayou Manchac and the Amite River that included the city of New Orleans.

The British divided this southern region of the North American continent into two separate colonies: East Florida, with its capital in St. Augustine and West Florida, with Pensacola as its capital. Many of the Spanish inhabitants of Florida were evacuated to Cuba, and new British settlers arrived including some from the Thirteen Colonies.

By a separate treaty, France ceded its lands west of the Mississippi to Spain, which formed Spanish Louisiana with the capital at New Orleans.

== British era ==
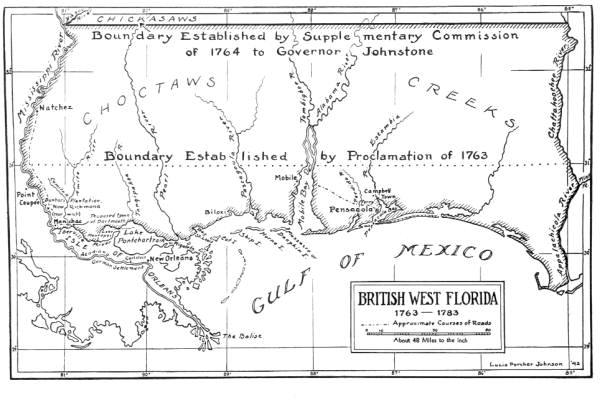
Britain formed West Florida from part of Spanish Florida, as well as territory received from French Louisiana.

In 1763, British troops arrived and took possession of Pensacola. George Johnstone was appointed as the first British Governor and, in 1764, a colonial assembly was established. The structure of the colony was modeled after the existing British colonies in America, as opposed to Quebec, which was based on a different structure. In contrast to East Florida, where there was little development and population growth, West Florida began to boom in the years following the British takeover, and thousands of new arrivals came to take advantage of the favorable conditions there. Ministers appointed to the Floridas petitioned the London authorities to build churches, parsonages, supply bibles and prayer-books, and help pay their passage to the colonies.

West Florida was invited to send delegates to the First Continental Congress which was convened to present colonial grievances against the British Parliament to George III, but along with several other colonies, including East Florida, they declined the invitation. Once the American War of Independence had broken out, the colonists remained overwhelmingly loyal to the Crown. In 1778, the Willing Expedition proceeded with a small force down the Mississippi, ransacking estates and plantations, until they were eventually defeated by a local militia. In the wake of this, the area received a small number of British reinforcements.

=== Government ===
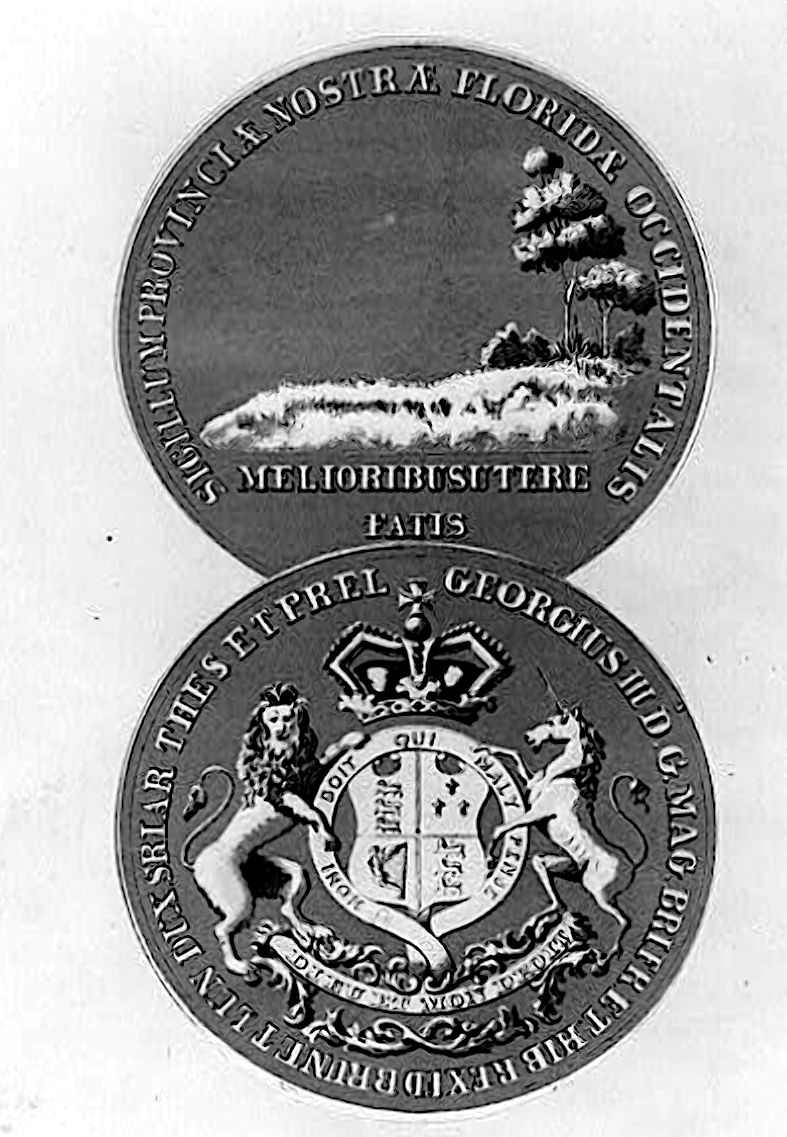
Seal of the Province of West Florida attached to British patents

The royal proclamation that established West Florida served a purpose similar to a constitution, describing how the colony was to function. Governance was similar to other British provinces located in North America, as the colony was to be administered locally by a governor, who was appointed. The governor was to be aided by a lieutenant governor and a twelve member advisory council, who were also appointed.

The advisory council served as the upper house of its legislature (the General Assembly), while the House of Commons was the lower house, with fourteen elected members. The actual influence of the General Assembly was rather limited as it lacked much autonomy. The General Assembly could only meet when being summoned by the governor. Any bill enacted would have to be signed by the governor to become law, and laws could not be passed in areas in which the British monarch had sole authority. West Florida's chief justice, provincial secretary and attorney general were appointed by Parliament.

=== Population and demographics ===
With the issuing of the 1763 Royal Proclamation, which set a border on Western expansion, the British hoped that the creation of both Floridas and Quebec would take pressure off the line of settlement. During the evacuation of Florida, most of the Spanish left Pensacola and its surroundings, while most of the French who lived near Mobile decided to stay.

Most males who came to West and East Florida in the 1760s did so because of government appointments or had relations with the colonial government or did work for the British military; while most females came along with their families.

Efforts were made by the British and provincial government to encourage non-British immigrants to live in West Florida. One of the largest instances was when a town named Campbelltown was founded by French Huguenots who were brought to the colony by Lieutenant Governor Montfort Browne and the colony's board of trade. Campbelltown required assistance by the council and governor several times before it was eventually abandoned. Acadians were encouraged to settle in the colony and a group of Germans settled on the coast west of Mobile and even at one point the British imperial government tried to encourage German Palatines to immigrate to the colony.

Governor George Johnstone, in office 1763-1767, estimated the population of British West Florida at 1800 or 2000 white people, mostly residing in Pensacola and Mobile, or new colonists settling along the Gulf Coast and in the more fertile lands around Natchez. According to one historian,

a rough analysis of the record yields interesting results. Of some five hundred odd names in the record, approximately four hundred seem to be of English, Scottish, or Irish descent. Of these a little less than one hundred clearly occupy official positions. This probably accounts for their presence in the colony. Some seventy odd French are entered as grantees. Seven grantees seem to be without doubt Hebrews, three seem to be Germans from Pennsylvania, two Germans from the Cote D’Allemand [i.e., the coast west of Mobile], and three other grantees might be either Italian or Spanish.

=== Economics and slavery ===
Although slavery and the slave trade did exist in British West Florida, it never became dominated by it and slavery remained likely small. Instead, the provincial and imperial government tried to develop a class consisting of small farmers and artisans instead of one that was plantation based.

The colonial government of West Florida maintained friendly relations with Native American tribes similar to the East Florida government so they could trade with them. Pensacola was described as having "especially significant" trade with the Creek and Choctaw tribes.

Most of those who lived in Florida made a living from the land. Attempts were made to try and develop a reliable cash crop but this was not successful. Indigo production grew dramatically between the 1760s and 1770s with 15,000 pounds (6,800 kg) shipped out of Mobile and Pensacola in 1772, making it one of the most common and successful of agriculture efforts made in the colony.

Pensacola handled five times more international trade than Mobile did. A sizable portion of West Florida's trade was illegal trade between West Florida and Spanish Louisiana. The exact numbers are hard to assess but authorities in both Florida and Louisiana were well aware of this issue but were not well equipped to monitor the situation. These high levels of trade led to silver Spanish coins becoming practically Florida's currency.

== Spanish conquest ==
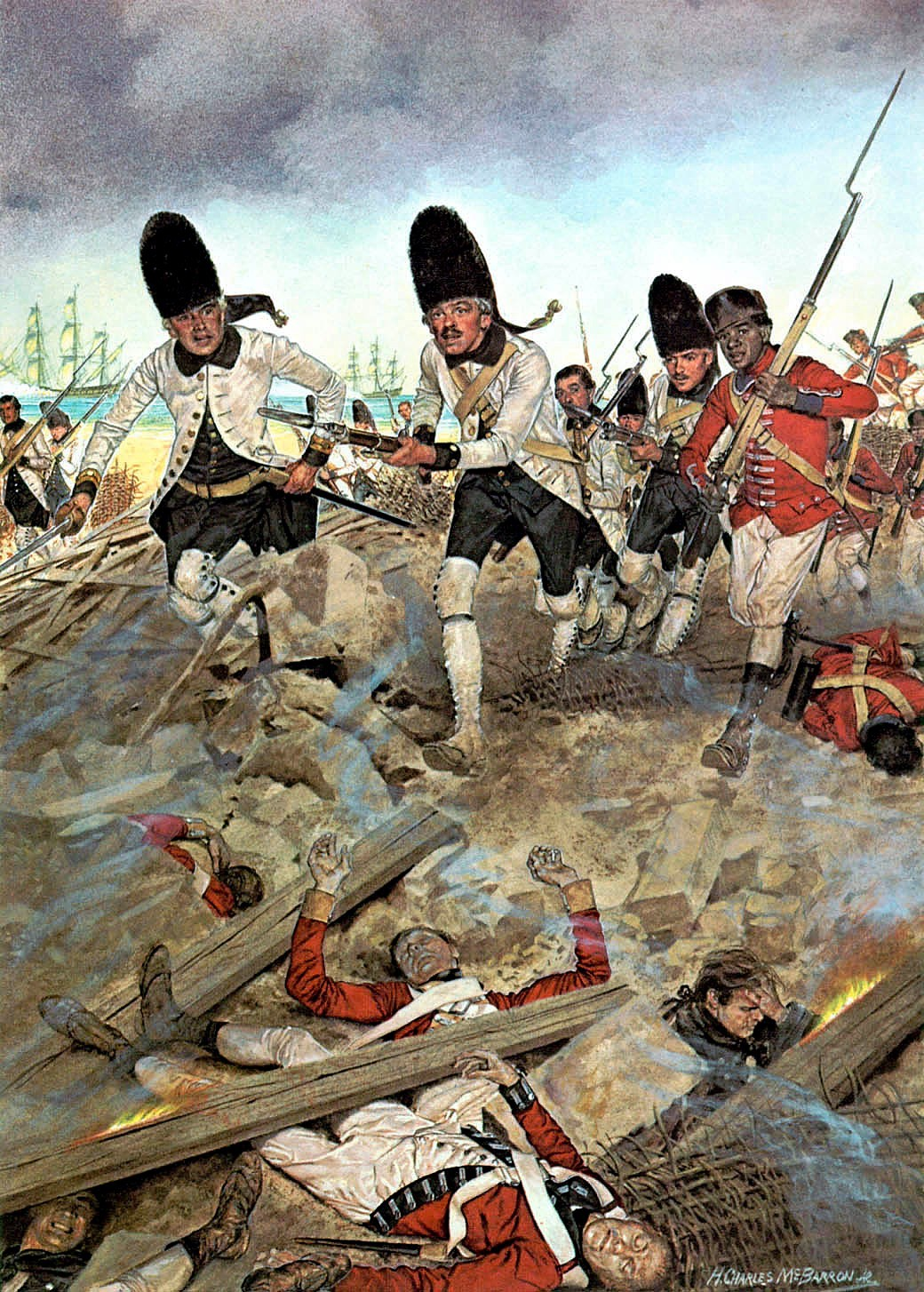
Spanish troops storming Pensacola in 1781

Following an agreement signed at Aranjuez, Spain entered the American Revolutionary War on the side of France but not the Thirteen Colonies. Spanish troops under Bernardo de Gálvez advanced and seized Baton Rouge and Mobile. In 1781, Spain captured Pensacola and its garrison. As part of the 1783 Peace of Paris, Great Britain ceded the territories of West Florida and East Florida back to Spain.

When Spain acquired West Florida in 1783, the eastern British boundary was the Apalachicola River, but Spain moved it eastward to the Suwannee River in 1785. The purpose was to transfer San Marcos and the district of Apalachee from East Florida to West Florida.

== See also ==
- West Florida
- Republic of West Florida
- East Florida
- British America
- Spanish West Florida
- Negro Fort
- Dominion of British West Florida, 21st century micronation

== Bibliography ==
- Calloway, Colin Gordon. The Scratch of a Pen: 1763 and the Transformation of North America. Oxford University Press, 2006.
- Chavez, Thomas E. Spain and the Independence of the United States: An Intrinsic Gift. University of New Mexico Press, 2003.
