= Philip Nolan (Texas trader) =

Freebooter and trader

- Born: 1771; Belfast, Ireland
- Died: 21 March 1801 (aged 29–30); Hill County, New Philippines, Viceroyalty of New Spain
- Resting place: Unknown (Body lost or destroyed).
- Occupations: Horsetrader, freebooter
- Known for: being a filibuster
- Spouses: Gertrudis Quiñones; Frances Lintot
- Children: Maria Josefa; Philip, Jr.
- Parent(s): Peter Nolan; Elizabeth (Cassidy) Nolan

Philip Nolan (1771 – 21 March 1801) was a mustang trader and freebooter in Natchez, on the Mississippi River, and the Spanish province of New Philippines (part of what later became Texas).

== Early life ==
Philip Nolan was born to Peter Nolan and Elizabeth Cassidy Nolan in Belfast, Ireland, in 1771.

== Career ==
As a teen, he worked for the Kentucky (part of Virginia until 1792) and Spanish Louisiana entrepreneur James Wilkinson as his business secretary and bookkeeper (from 1788 to 1791). He handled much of Wilkinson's New Orleans trade and became conversant in Spanish. During this time, he made the acquaintance of Manuel Gayoso de Lemos, the district governor of Natchez during the final years of Spanish control there.

In 1791, using the influence of Wilkinson, he obtained a trading passport from the Spanish governor of Louisiana and Spanish West Florida, Esteban Rodríguez Miró. He left Wilkinson's employ and set out to trade with the Indian tribes across the Mississippi. The passport was void in Spanish Texas, and his goods were confiscated by Spanish authorities. Nonetheless, and after living with the Indians for two years, Nolan returned to New Orleans with fifty horses.

He made a second trip to Texas in 1794−95, with a passport from the Louisiana governor. He made acquaintance with Texas Governor Manuel Muñoz and the commandant general of the Provincias Internas, Pedro de Nava. It was on this trip that he met his first wife. He brought back 250 horses.

In 1796, he worked for Andrew Ellicott, boundary commissioner for the United States, who was mapping the Missouri River. Governor Gayoso de Lemos was not pleased when Nolan arrived at Natchez accompanied by the surveying party. However, Nolan managed to patch things up, at least with Governor Carondelet in New Orleans, and obtained a third passport to enter Texas, despite the fact that trade directly between Louisiana and Texas was still officially prohibited by Spain. Gayoso de Lemos was not fooled. He wrote directly to the viceroy of Mexico, warning him against foreigners (such as Nolan) who were stirring up the Texas Indians against Spanish rule.

In the summer of 1797, he left on his third trip to Texas with a wagon train of trade goods, which he successfully brought to La Villa de San Fernando de Béxar, Spanish Texas (now San Antonio, the seat of Bexar County), where he insinuated himself in Spanish Texas society. Commandant General Pedro de Nava was ordered by the viceroy to deal with Nolan, but Governor Muñoz defended Nolan and provided him with safe conduct out of Texas. Nolan left Texas and came back to Natchez in the autumn of 1799 with more than 1,200 horses.

Nolan is sometimes credited with being the first to map Texas for the American frontiersmen, but his map has never been found. Nonetheless, his observations were passed on to Wilkinson, who used them to produce his map of the Texas−Louisiana frontier in 1804.

Nolan was unable to obtain any more passports from the Spanish authorities. He conceived or borrowed a scheme to go illegally into Texas and perhaps other Mexican provinces. There is considerable dispute about the exact nature of this filibustering expedition; some claim that he promised his men that they would seize riches and land and create a kingdom for themselves. In any case, he convinced some thirty frontiersmen that the expedition would make them rich. They crossed the border in October 1800 and headed north of Nacogdoches to capture wild mustangs. The Spanish soon heard of their activities, and Pedro de Nava ordered their arrest.

== Personal life ==
He had an out-of-wedlock relationship with Maria Gertrudis Dolores Quiñones, with whom he had a daughter Maria Josefa, born August 20, 1798, in what is now San Antonio, Texas. Philip was separated from Maria before July 1800.

He married the former Frances Lintot, a daughter of Bernard Lintot, a prominent Natchez citizen, on December 19, 1799. Frances bore him a son Philip Nolan, Jr., in July 1801, after he had left on his fourth and final trip to Texas. Frances died before the year was out, and the son didn't survive to adulthood.

== Death ==
On March 21, 1801, a Spanish force of 120 men under the command of Lieutenant M. Músquiz left Nacogdoches in pursuit of Nolan, whom they encountered entrenched and unwilling to surrender just upstream from where the current Nolan River flows into the larger Brazos (now in Hill County, Texas). Several of Nolan's men surrendered immediately to the Spanish and after Nolan was killed, the remainder yielded. Nolan's ears were cut off as evidence for Spain that he was dead. The first-hand account of the expedition, capture and subsequent imprisonment is contained in the Memoirs of Ellis P. Bean, who was second in command of the expedition. A river and county were named after him.

In early 1949, Rev. Rhea Kuykendall, a descendant of one Joseph Pierce who had settled on the "old Dixon Grant" along Mustang Creek, found the weathered tombstone of Philip Nolan. Mustang Creek is near Blum and State Highway 174.

== Notes ==
1. Entry in the Census of Nacogdoches by Antonio Gil Ybabro, December 31, 1792.
2. , as compiled by Steve Gibson, updated August 2, 2004.
3. Handbook of Texas Online: "Nolan, Philip" by Jack Jackson, uploaded on June 15, 2010. Published by the Texas State Historical Association, accessed March 13, 2016.
4. , as compiled by Steve Gibson, updated August 2, 2004.
5. Handbook of Texas Online: "Nolan, Philip". Last accessed March 13, 2016.
6. Bean, Ellis P. (1816). Appendix No. II, "Memoir of Colonel Ellis P. Bean" as published in History of Texas From Its First Settlement In 1685 To Its Annexation To The United States In 1846. New York: Redfield (1856). pp. 403–452. ISBN 9780598276636.
