= Francisco Bouligny =

Spanish Army officer and colonial administrator (1736–1800)

The Most Excellent Brigadier general Don Francisco Bouligny
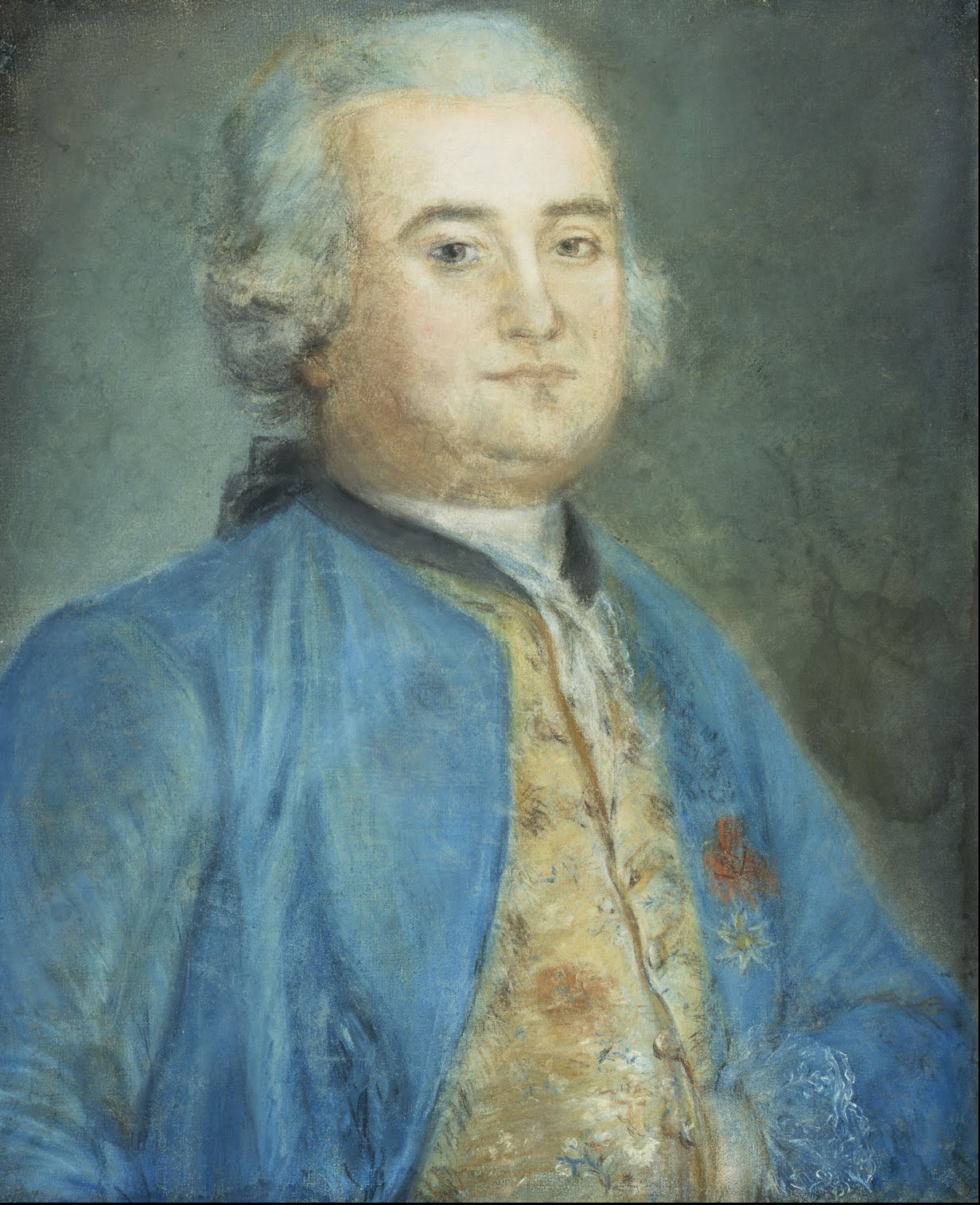
- Portrait by unknown artist

9th Spanish Governor of Louisiana Governor and Captain General of West Florida
- Acting; 18 July – 18 September 1799 Serving with Nicolás María Vidal and Sebastián Calvo de la Puerta
- Monarch: Charles IV
- First Secretary of State: Mariano Luis de Urquijo
- Viceroy of New Spain: Miguel José de Azanza
- Captain General of Cuba: Salvador de Muro y Salazar
- Preceded by: Manuel Gayoso de Lemos
- Succeeded by: Juan Manuel de Salcedo

Personal details
- Born: Francisco Domingo Joseph Bouligny y Paret; September 4, 1736 Alicante, Spain
- Died: November 25, 1800 (aged 64) New Orleans, Louisiana, New Spain
- Resting place: St. Louis Cathedral
- Spouse: Marie-Louise Le Sénéchal d'Auberville (m. 1770)
- Relations: Juan de Bouligny (brother)
- Known for: Founder of New Iberia
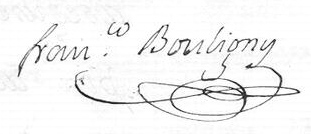
- Signature
- Nickname: Frasquito

Military service
- Allegiance: Spain
- Branch: Spanish Army
- Years of service: 1758–1800
- Rank: Brigadier general
- Commands: Louisiana Fixed Infantry Regiment (1791–1797)
- Battles: American Revolutionary War; Battle of Manchac Post; Battle of Baton Rouge; Battle of Fort Charlotte; Battle of Pensacola

Brigadier General Don Francisco Domingo Joseph Bouligny y Paret (4 September 1736 – 25 November 1800) was a Spanish Army officer and colonial administrator who served as an acting governor of Louisiana in 1799. As a francophone in Spanish service, he was a bridge between Creole and French Louisiana and Spain following the transfer of the territory from France to Spain. Bouligny also served as lieutenant governor under Bernardo de Gálvez and founded New Iberia in 1779.

== Early life and career ==
Bouligny, called "Frasquito" by his family, was born in 1736 in Alicante, Spain, to Jean (Juan) Bouligny, a successful merchant of French ancestry, and Marie Paret, who was from Alicante. At the age of 10, he was sent to a boys' school founded by the Bishop of Orihuela, from which he graduated in 1750 and joined the family import-export business, which traded textiles, spices, wines, and more from both around the Mediterranean and across the Atlantic.

In 1758, Bouligny joined in the Spanish Army, serving the Regiment of Zamora. A year later, he transferred to the Royal Regiment of Spanish Guards and was commissioned as a lieutenant in the infantry and sent to Havana, Cuba, in 1762. At that time, Spain had entered the Seven Years' War and, while Bouligny was en route from Cádiz, the British captured Havana. New orders had Bouligny wait out the remainder of the war in Santa Cruz de Tenerife in the Canary Islands. In August 1763, Bouligny arrived in Havana where he was stationed until 1769 when he joined Alejandro O'Reilly as an aide-de-camp for his expedition to put down the Louisiana Rebellion. As Bouligny was fluent in French, he was charged with delivering the Spanish government's messages to the Francophone inhabitants of Louisiana and he acted as an interpreter during the military trial of the rebellion's leaders.

Bouligny was promoted to the rank of brevet captain in the newly formed Louisiana Fixed Infantry Battalion. In 1772, he was appointed by Gov. Luis de Unzaga as a full captain. However, a year later Bouligny was relieved from command by Unzaga and placed under house arrest for ordering a group of deserters six-year prison terms instead of the four-month sentence proscribed by the king's code. Ultimately, O'Reilly interceded on Bouligny's behalf and he was restored to his command with a warning.

In 1775, Bouligny was granted leave to return to Europe to settle family affairs. While in Spain, Bouligny wrote a discourse on the population of New Orleans, Louisiana (Memoria histórica y política sobre la Luisiana). Memoria brought the Spanish court's attention to its Louisiana holdings and their potential for agricultural development and trade. He noted with great detail the region's geography and hydrology, including flooding caused by storm surges into Lakes Borgne and Pontchartrain. Memoria also highlighted the importance of good relations with the region's Native American peoples, and the need to improve the territory's defenses as a strategic buffer against British North America. To this end, Bouligny included in Memoria detailed suggestions for new and strengthened fortifications along the territory's many waterways. The report was well received in Madrid and was influential in guiding the future development of Louisiana.

=== Founding of New Iberia ===
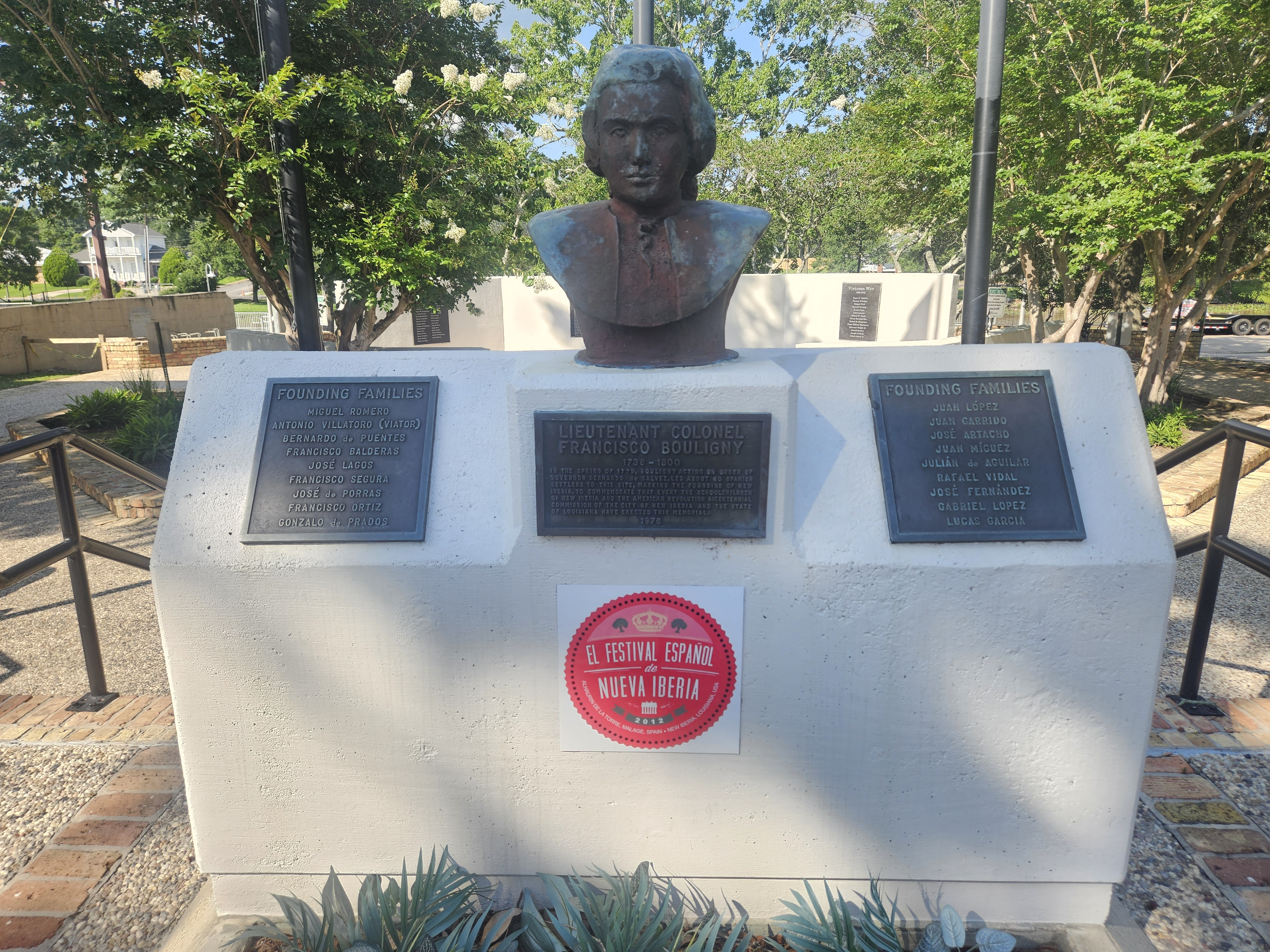
Monument honoring Francisco Bouligny and the first Malagueño settlers of New Iberia, Louisiana.

In 1777, Bouligny returned to Louisiana, where he was named lieutenant governor by Gov. Bernardo de Gálvez. Among his responsibilities was managing trade and relations with Native American tribes and founding new settlements. In Memoria, Bouligny advocated settling Spanish and other Catholic immigrants throughout Louisiana to bolster Spain's hold on the territory, including Anglo-Americans who were willing to switch their loyalties to Spain. Following on this settlement plan, in April 1779, Bouligny brought a group of 500 colonists, primarily Malagueños along with some Isleños, up Bayou Teche to establish the city of New Iberia.

However, the relationship between Bouligny and Gálvez was a tense one. The two clashed over issues around trade and settlement, in particular the location of the New Iberia settlement and Gálvez's approach towards British settlement near the Mississippi River. Bouligny also mixed personal and official business, including at least one occasion paying himself for the use of his slaves. Gálvez steadily worked to isolate Bouligny, calling into question his actions, auditing heavily the expenses of the New Iberia settlement and Bouligny's personal finances, and not recommending him for advancement.

=== American Revolutionary War ===
In late 1779, during the American Revolutionary War, Spain attacked British holdings in West Florida, and Bouligny participated in the battles of Manchac Post and the Baton Rouge. In 1780, Bouligny led an expedition against the British at Fort Charlotte, and he later participated in the Battle of Pensacola.

== Later life and career ==
In 1783, Bouligny was ordered to eliminate a colony of fugitives from slavery (cimarrones) downriver from New Orleans. By June 1784, the expedition captured 60 people, including the colony's leader, Jean Saint Malo; in the following investigation, officials identified a dozen slaves as helping to plan escapes from plantations.

In 1784, while Gov. Esteban Rodríguez Miró travelled to West Florida to treat with the Muscogee, Chickasaw, and Choctaw nations, Bouligny served as acting governor of Louisiana. The next year, Miró sent Bouligny to Natchez to enforce Spanish rule in the area and to resist American encroachment related to the West Florida Controversy. In March 1791, Bouligny was appointed colonel and placed in command of the Louisiana Fixed Infantry Regiment, a post he held until 1797.

Following the death of Gov. Manuel Gayoso de Lemos on 18 July 1799, Francisco Bouligny was appointed as military governor of Louisiana, with Nicolás María Vidal as civil governor, until the new governor general, Sebastián Calvo de la Puerta y O'Farrill, Marquess de Casa Calvo, reached the colony on 18 December 1799. Bouligny died in New Orleans on November 25, 1800, following a long illness. He was honored by being buried in St. Louis Cathedral. In September 1800, the Spanish Crown appointed Bouligny brigadier general, but the written copy of the commission did not reach Louisiana until after his death.

== Personal life ==
Bouligny was described as being "rather tall and slight, with a noble military bearing, easy and dignified in his manners, and warm in his friendship." Throughout his life, Bouligny kept up active correspondence in both French and Spanish with his family and officials around the world. Depending upon the language used, his first name is given as "Francisco" or "François."

On 29 December 1770, Bouligny married Marie-Louise Le Sénéchal d'Auberville (1750–1834) who belonged to a prominent French Louisiana family. It was an advantageous marriage for both families, with Bouligny's political connections helping to settle an outstanding debt owed to Le Sénéchal d'Auberville's mother and enabling him to begin amassing property holdings in the city. The couple had four children, including Charles Dominique Joseph Bouligny, who was elected by the state legislature to the U.S. Senate in the 1820s, and Louis Bouligny, after whom the Faubourg Bouligny neighborhood of New Orleans was named. His grandson John Edward Bouligny was elected to Congress in 1859. Bouligny's older brother, Juan de Bouligny, served as the first Spanish ambassador to the Ottoman Empire from 1779 to 1793.

== Legacy ==
Bouligny left behind what was considered an extensive library of 48 works in 147 volumes, a wine cellar holding some 500 bottles of wine, and 31 slaves. His library included histories of Ancient Rome, France, America, the Russian Empire, and Germany, as well as the conquest of Mexico and Captain Cook's third voyage. Most of the works were in French; only five were in Spanish.

In 1977, descendants of Bouligny founded the Bouligny Foundation to promote the study of Spanish Louisiana by supporting research and an annual lecture series. After the foundation dissolved in the early 2000s, the annual Bouligny Lecture program was continued by The Historic New Orleans Collection.

Government offices
Preceded by Manuel Gayoso de Lemos	Governor of Louisiana; Acting; July—December 1799; With: Nicolás María Vidal	Succeeded by Sebastián Calvo de la Puerta y O'Farrill
