= Nicolás María Vidal =

Civil governor of Spanish Louisiana and Spanish Florida

Governor of Louisiana Acting
- In office 1799–1801 Serving with Francisco Bouligny (1799); Sebastián Calvo de la Puerta (1799–1801)
- Monarch: Charles IV
- Preceded by: Manuel Gayoso de Lemos
- Succeeded by: Juan Manuel de Salcedo

Personal details
- Born: December 10, 1739 Cartagena de Indias, Colombia
- Died: May 25, 1806 (aged 66) Pensacola, Florida
- Domestic partner: Eufrosina Hisnard

Don Nicolás María Vidal y Madrigal (10 December 1739 – 25 May 1806) was a colonial official in Spanish Louisiana and Spanish Florida from 1799–1801.

== Biography ==
Vidal was born in Cartagena de Indias in 1739 to Pedro Luis Vidal and Josefina Marcelina Madrigal y Valdés. He was educated at the Colegio de San Bartolomé, Santa Fé in Bogotá, Colombia and earned degrees in civil and canon law in 1763. He worked for 20 years as an attorney in Colombia for both the Spanish government and private clients, including serving as an interim governor in Popayán and Quito. He also worked as a law professor at the Colegio Seminario de San Bartolomé.

In 1790, he was posted to Louisiana as a governmental legal adviser (auditor de guerra), arriving in New Orleans on March 17, 1791. Vidal's relationship with The Cabildo was contentious with disputes over larger issues like smallpox vaccination, fire hazards, and slavery, as well as minutia around protocol. In particular, Vidal was opposed to plays, which he considered incompatible with "public decency", going so far as to order closed the city's only theatre in October 1799.

Following the death of Louisiana Governor Manuel Gayoso de Lemos of yellow fever on July 18, 1799, Vidal was named civil governor of Spanish Louisiana alongside Col. Francisco Bouligny, who was named military governor of the territory, under the authority of the new Acting Governor General Sebastián Calvo de la Puerta, 1st Marquess of Casa Calvo. After Bouligny's death, Vidal continued to serve as lieutenant-governor under Casa Calvo until the last Spanish governor, Juan Manuel de Salcedo, arrived to oversee implementation of the Third Treaty of San Ildefonso and the return of Louisiana to France. After the transfer of Louisiana to the United States was complete, Vidal removed to Pensacola, capital of Spanish West Florida, where he served as auditor de guerra until his death in 1806.

== Personal life ==
Vidal was described as a "shameless roué with a face like a monkey," and in his official acts he was very sensitive to the importance of his position. He complained to Spanish officials on several occasions about public slights and offences.

Starting in 1800, Vidal acquired through purchase and a royal grant several properties along Bayou St. John in New Orleans to establish a plantation. He sold the property in 1804, following the sale of Louisiana.

Vidal acknowledged at least four children — Carolina Maria Salome (b. 1793), Maria Josefa de las Mercedes (b. 1795), and two older daughters — born through plaçage relationships with free women of color. The unnamed daughters were born in Colombia to women identified as a "mulata libre" and a "negra libre" and were left with their mothers in Cartagena when Vidal moved to Louisiana. In Louisiana, he entered into a relationship with Eufrosina Hisnard, who at the time was about 15 years old. Hisnard and Vidal had Mercedes and Carolina, along with a son who died in infancy. Although he was not listed on the children's baptism records, Hisnard and Vidal's daughters were accepted as part of Vidal's social circle without scandal.

Following Vidal's death, Mercedes and her mother sought help from U.S. authorities in the newly acquired Florida Territory in settling Vidal's estate, which led to a conflict between Andrew Jackson, the newly appointed military commissioner and governor, and the last Spanish governor of Florida, José María Callava.

Government offices
Preceded by Manuel Gayoso de Lemos	Governor of Louisiana; Acting; 1799–1801; With: Francisco Bouligny (1799); Sebastián Calvo de la Puerta y O'Farrill (1799-1801)	Succeeded by Juan Manuel de Salcedo
