= Fort Carondelet =

Fort in Spanish Louisiana

Coordinates: 38.0370052°N 94.2111969°W

Fort Carondelet

Fort Carondelet was a fort located along the Osage River in Vernon County, Missouri, constructed in 1795 as an early fur trading post in Spanish Louisiana by the Chouteau family. The fort also was used by the Spanish colonial government to maintain good relations with the Osage Nation. Sold by the Chouteau family in 1802, the fort was abandoned the same year by its new owners. By the time of an 1806 visit by Zebulon Pike on his expedition through southern Louisiana, the buildings were in disrepair. Although archaeological remains of the fort and its buildings were extant in 1874, a congregation known as the Church of Israel (affiliated with the Christian Identity movement) has occupied the site since the 1940s.

== Origins ==
Starting in the mid-1700s, the Osage Nation traded furs with French and Spanish settlers, especially the French brothers Pierre Chouteau and Auguste Chouteau from the settlement of St. Louis. The Chouteaus were authorized to trade by the Spanish colonial government, and by 1787 built a temporary trading post along the Osage River in what is now western Missouri.

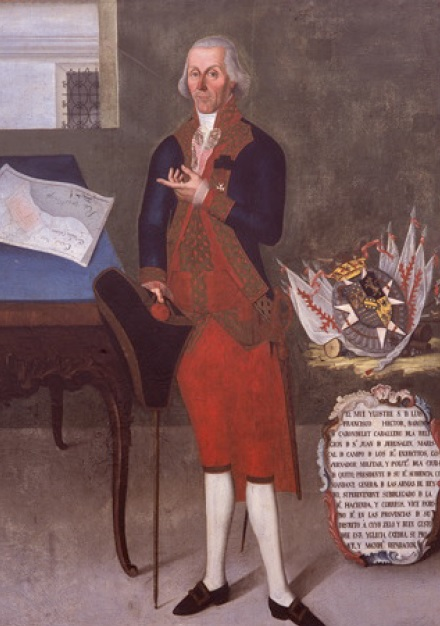
Francisco Luis Hector, Baron of Carondelet, namesake of Fort Carondelet

Spanish Governor General Esteban Rodríguez Miró first proposed a fort in western Missouri in 1791, looking to strengthen Spanish allies living among the Osage. Before the fort was built, Miro was replaced as Spanish governor general by Francisco Luis Héctor de Carondelet. Concerned that the Osage would ally themselves with the French, Carondelet requested a peace meeting with six Osage chiefs in mid-1794, at which the Osage chiefs agreed (in exchange for peace) to allow the construction of the fort. Carondelet was informed that the fur trader, Auguste Chouteau, would financially support the construction of the fort as a replacement for his temporary trading post along the Osage River. In a letter to Carondelet, Chouteau described the proposed fort buildings in detail:

The said stronghold is to be composed of two parts: The first shall be of brick or stone and the second of logs ten inches square laid horizontally one upon the other, as the Americans practice. It shall form a perfect square each side of thirty-two feet. The second part shall be placed diagonally, that is, so that each side shall cut and correspond to the angle of the first story, and each angle to the middle side of the second story, by which means those defending the top can exterminate with hand-grenades and guns through the holes in the plankwork, all those who attempt to force the door or approach the base of the wall.

The planking of the first story floors shall be at least three inches thick unless the contractor prefer to use tight bricks or stone of same dimensions. That of the second story shall be at least two inches thick and that of the garret shall be of common boards.

The elevation of the first story shall be ten feet between first and second floors, that of the second story nine feet in the same manner. The roof shall have a height of six or eight feet and be covered with tiles, bricks, slate or mud. All the woodwork shall be sustained by four posts, set at equal intervals in the interior of the edifices, on which the beam shall rest to insure greater solidity.

There shall be two embrasures in each facade of the first story, ten by eight inches square, for placing artillery on pillars with a very thick door as on the vessels. The door of the fort of the most solid nature with hinges, bolts and lock of iron, shall be feet high and five feet wide. The stairway to upper story shall be solid and well conditioned; there shall be on each side of second story, ten loop-holes for guns feet over the floor, and two at the extremities of the lower sides at a height of six feet, so that they can be used by mounting on a chair without danger of the enemy being able to insert guns to fire into the lower story.

— Auguste Chouteau, Letter to Carondelet, New Orleans, May 18, 1794.

Given his desire for peace with the Osage, Carondelet accepted Chouteau's proposal. According to the terms of the agreement between Chouteau and Carondelet, Chouteau received $2,000 annually to support twenty soldiers at the fort and a six-year monopoly on trade with the Osage, unless the Spanish government itself supplied the soldiers (in which case, Chouteau would receive the monopoly but no more).

== Use and abandonment ==
After its construction in 1795, Fort Carondelet was used as the farthest western outpost for the Chouteau trading operations and not as a military fort. Pierre Chouteau operated the post, bringing his sons to live among the neighboring Osage. His sons in turn became familiar with the culture of the Osage and the life of indigenous peoples in general. For their part, members of the Osage Nation accepted Chouteau and his family. Other tribes (such as the Miami) became jealous of the perceived favoritism shown to the Osage Nation.

One of the major effects of the fort was its role in expanding the Chouteau trade operation. While commander of the fort, Pierre Chouteau (along with his son, Auguste Pierre Chouteau) expanded trade from Fort Carondelet to other Osage settlements near the Arkansas River by 1796. By 1800 rivals to the Chouteau operation began demanding that the government break its contract monopoly. That same year, new Spanish Governor General Juan Manuel de Salcedo gave the Chouteau's trade rights to one of their Spanish rivals, Manuel Lisa. In 1802, abandoning his effort to maintain his monopoly, Pierre Chouteau sold Fort Carondelet to Lisa, who withdrew the garrison and abandoned the fort. During the transfer of the Louisiana territory to the possession of the United States in 1804, Auguste Chouteau was employed by Spain to remove any remaining Spanish property from the fort.

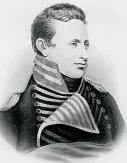
Zebulon Pike, American explorer who visited the site in 1806

After 1802, the fort's buildings fell into disrepair, and by 1806, they were overgrown with vegetation. According to an entry in the journal of Zebulon Pike during his expedition through southern Louisiana:

We embarked at five o'clock and came twelve miles to breakfast. A four o'clock came to ten French houses on the east shore [of the Osage River], where was then residing a Sac, who was married to an Osage femme and spoke French only. We afterwards passed the position where Mr. Chouteau formerly had his fort, not a vestige of which was remaining, the spot being only marked by the superior growth of vegetation.

— Zebulon Pike, Diary of the Pike Expedition, August 17, 1806.

After the Pike Expedition, few travelers reported the site of the fort. The last report of the fort's existence derives from an 1874 Missouri travel guidebook relating the physical characteristics of Vernon County. While not explicitly mentioning the fort, the guidebook noted the top of Halley's Bluff had "the foundations of three furnaces" and "the remains of works—both earth and stone, covering the approaches to the furnaces and the descent to the excavations below, as if thrown up for fortifications. Later, the guidebook suggested that the works were remnants of French explorers who had built a headquarters for their operations there.

In the early 20th century, Halley's Bluff (and the site of the fort) became the possession of a Mormon group that eventually separated from the Church of Christ (Temple Lot). This group, known as the Church of Christ at Halley's Bluff, controlled the property as a compound from 1945 until 1979. Since a dispute over control of the church in the 1970s, the compound has been the property of the Church of Israel, a Christian Identity group. In the 1980s, the church compound was home to Eric Robert Rudolph, who committed the Centennial Olympic Park bombing in 1996.
