= Callava =

Callava is a Spanish surname. Notable people with the surname include:

- José María Callava, last governor of Spanish West Florida (1819–1821)
- Andrés Echevarría Callava, known as Niño Rivera (1919–1996), Cuban musician
