= Sebastián Calvo de la Puerta =

Governor of Louisiana (1751–1820)

Sebastián Calvo de la Puerta y O'Farrill KOS
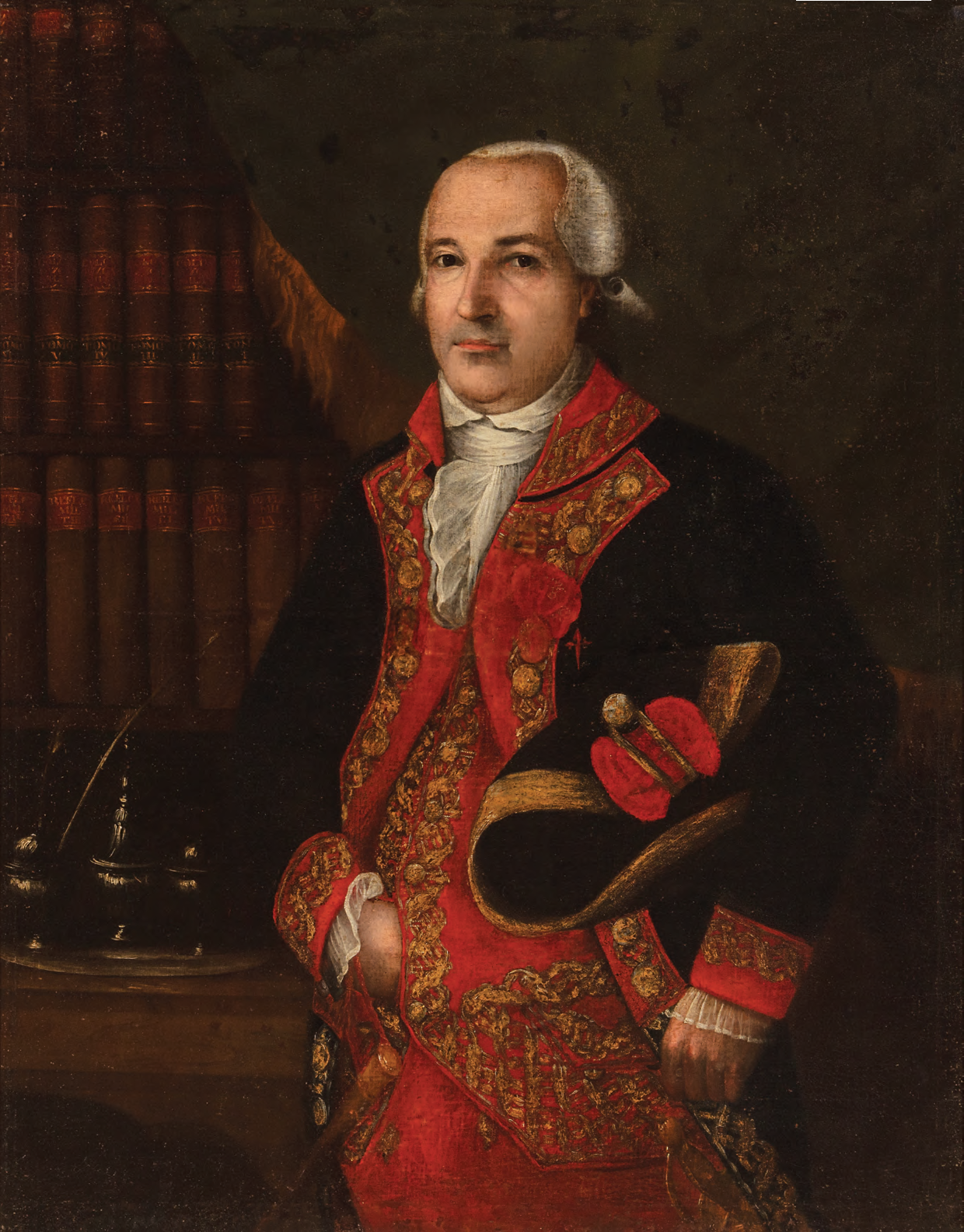
- Portrait of an Important Spanish Colonial Official, likely Sebastian Nicolas Calvo de la Puerta y O'Farrill, Marquess de Casa Calvo, by José Francisco Xavier de Salazar y Mendoza (c. 1800)

10th Governor of Spanish Louisiana
- In office 1799–1801 Serving with Nicolás María Vidal
- Monarch: Charles IV
- Preceded by: Francisco Bouligny
- Succeeded by: Juan Manuel de Salcedo

Personal details
- Born: Sebastián Nicolás Calvo de la Puerta y O'Farrill; August 11, 1751 Artemisa, Spanish Cuba, Spanish Empire
- Died: May 27, 1820 (aged 68) Paris, France
- Resting place: Père Lachaise Cemetery
- Spouse: Louisa Peñelvar y Navarette (m. 1781; died 1792)

Military service
- Allegiance: Viceroyalty of New Spain; Kingdom of Spain; Napoleonic Spain
- Branch/service: Spanish Army
- Battles/wars: Louisiana Rebellion; American Revolutionary War; Peninsular War
- Awards: Order of Santiago

Sebastián Nicolás de Bari Calvo de la Puerta y O'Farrill, 1st Marquess of Casa Calvo, KOS (August 1751 – 27 May 1820) was a Spanish nobleman and soldier who served as Governor of Louisiana between 1799 and 1801.

== Early life and career ==
He was born in Artemisa, Cuba, around 1751 or possibly 1754, according to different sources. He was the son of Pedro Calvo de la Puerta and Catalina O'Farrill. He pursued a military career from an early age, starting with enrollment as a cadet in the Company of Nobles in 1763.

Casa Calvo first came to Louisiana in 1769 as part of Alejandro O'Reilly's company, and served under Bernardo de Galvez in the Mobile campaign in 1780 during the American Revolutionary War. He received his title of nobility (Marqués de Casa Calvo) and knighthood in the Order of Santiago on May 20, 1786, by Charles III.

In 1794, Casa Calvo participated in the capture of Fort-Dauphin, Saint-Domingue, from the French during the Haitian Revolution, and was in charge of the Spanish garrison there at the time of the massacre of Bayajá. He later was named governor of Bayajá and placed in charge of army operations against the French Republic in Santo Domingo until the colony was returned to France as part of the Peace of Basel.

While living in Cuba, he married María Luisa Peñelvar y Navarette (1764–1792), a native of Havana, in 1781.

== Governor of Spanish Louisiana ==
At the time of Governor Gayoso's death in 1799, Casa Calvo was residing in Cuba, where he was serving as a judge advocate. Casa Calvo was appointed interim military governor until the arrival of Juan Manuel de Salcedo, whose arrival was delayed by ill health until 1801. When Salcedo returned Louisiana to the French in 1803, Casa Calvo was there to assist in the transition, making him the only one of the Spanish governors of Louisiana to have been present at both the beginning and end of Spanish rule.

== Later life ==
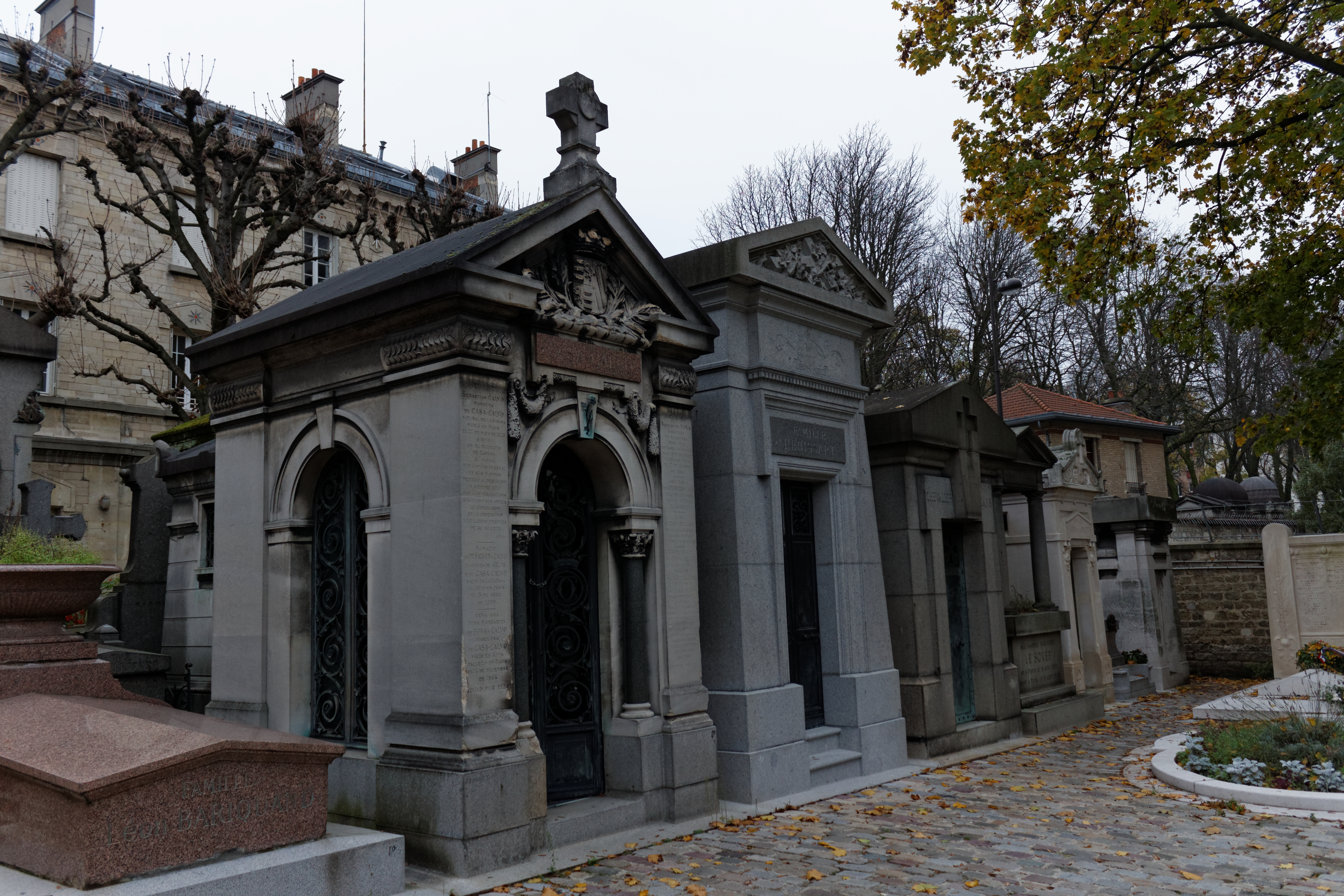
Tomb of Sebastián Calvo de la Puerta y O'Farrill in Père Lachaise Cemetery

Before Spain returned Louisiana to France, the latter had promised to keep the colony from falling into American hands, but in reality, France had already sold it to the United States. Casa Calvo remained in Louisiana after the transition to American rule, ostensibly to help determine the western border with Texas. During this time, James Wilkinson, then the governor of the Territory of Louisiana, sought to engage with Casa Calvo to provide information that would strengthen Spain's hand in the negotiations. William C.C. Claiborne, governor of the Territory of Orleans, with whom Casa Calvo was negotiating, did not trust Casa Calvo and ordered him to leave in 1806.

Casa Calvo departed for Pensacola, narrowly avoiding a shipwreck en route, and requested permission to lead a military expedition against Louisiana. His request was denied, and he moved to Madrid. He was a fervent Bonapartist during the reign of Joseph Bonaparte; after the fall of the Bonapartists in Spain, he fled to Paris, where he remained until his death in 1820.

Preceded by Francisco Bouligny	Spanish Governor of Louisiana; 1799–1801; With: Nicolás María Vidal	Succeeded by Juan Manuel de Salcedo
