= Hispanics and Latinos in Tennessee =

Hispanic and Latino Americans in Tennessee are residents of the U.S. state of Tennessee who are of Hispanic or Latino origin. The United States Census Bureau estimated that Hispanic or Latino people made up 8.6 percent of the state's population in 2025. Most of that growth is recent. Tennessee had one of the fastest-growing Hispanic populations in the country between 2000 and 2010, and Mexico is the most common country of birth among the state's immigrants. Since 2025, Tennessee has been one of the states most closely tied to federal immigration enforcement, which has affected Latino communities in Nashville and Memphis in particular.

== Demographics ==
The 2020 United States census counted 479,187 Hispanic or Latino residents in Tennessee, or 6.9 percent of the population. That was up from 290,059 (4.6 percent) in 2010 and 123,838 (2.2 percent) in 2000. The 134 percent increase between 2000 and 2010 was the third-highest of any state.

Hispanic or Latino population of Tennessee
Year	Population	Share of state
2000	123,838	2.2%
2010	290,059	4.6%
2020	479,187	6.9%

Statewide, 6.1 percent of residents were foreign-born in 2020–2024. In 2000, about 48 percent of Latinos in Tennessee were born in the United States, and the main countries of origin among the foreign-born were Mexico, Guatemala, Honduras and El Salvador.

The population is concentrated in the Nashville area, but growth has reached smaller cities and rural counties. In Knox County, the Hispanic share rose from 3.5 percent in 2010 to about 6 percent in 2020.

== History ==
=== Spanish exploration ===
Spanish expeditions were the first European presence in what is now Tennessee. Hernando de Soto's expedition entered the region in 1540, and Juan Pardo explored parts of the region in 1566 and 1567. In 1795 the Spanish governor of Louisiana, Manuel Gayoso de Lemos, built Fort San Fernando de las Barrancas on the Chickasaw bluffs at present-day Memphis. Spain abandoned it in 1797 under the Treaty of Pinckney.

=== Late 20th-century migration ===
Tennessee had very little Latin American immigration through most of the 20th century. In 1990, 1.2 percent of the state's population was foreign-born. Beginning in the mid-1990s, Latino migrants arrived in large numbers to work in construction, agriculture, manufacturing and services. Geographers and sociologists describe the Nashville area as a "new destination" for Latino immigration. Its Hispanic population grew by more than 400 percent between 1990 and 2000. Settlement centered on southeast Nashville, where Hispanic-owned businesses, churches and community organizations clustered along corridors such as Nolensville Pike.

In spring 2006, Nashville was one of many cities that saw rallies as part of the nationwide 2006 United States immigration reform protests, and thousands gathered there on March 29. Hispanic business leaders in the city were divided over joining a national economic boycott planned for May 1.

== Immigration enforcement since 2025 ==
State officials have worked closely with the second Trump administration, which took office in January 2025, on immigration enforcement.

=== May 2025 Nashville operation ===
From May 3 to May 10, 2025, the Tennessee Highway Patrol and U.S. Immigration and Customs Enforcement (ICE) ran a joint operation in Nashville. Troopers made traffic stops and ICE agents checked the immigration status of drivers. In a May 13, 2025, news release, ICE said it had detained 196 people, 95 of whom had criminal convictions. A joint investigation published in February 2026 by Mother Jones, Lighthouse Reports, the Nashville Banner, NewsChannel 5 and other outlets, based on highway patrol reports and dashcam footage, concluded that at most 159 people were detained and that about 40 had convictions. It also reported that most of the people stopped on the first night were Black, Latino or Middle Eastern, and that the stops were concentrated in South Nashville. The Tennessee Highway Patrol said it "does not engage in enforcement actions based on race, ethnicity, language, or national origin." The Nashville police department did not take part, and the city's leaders said they had not been told about the operation in advance.

=== 287(g) agreements and state law ===
Local participation in ICE's 287(g) program has grown quickly. In May 2025, six Tennessee agencies had agreements; as of January 2026, 56 did. As of September 2026, federal data showed that Tennessee agencies had signed 144 agreements since January 2025. In 2025, the state created an immigration enforcement office, and it launched a grant program for agencies that enter 287(g) agreements. In April 2026, the legislature passed a bill requiring all 95 county sheriffs to enter 287(g) agreements, with a compliance deadline of January 1, 2027. A separate 2026 law (HB 2018 / SB 1486) requires local law enforcement to honor ICE requests to hold detainees. For sheriffs with 287(g) agreements, that means holding people in jail for two more days. On September 16, 2026, ICE announced it was expanding its partnerships with state and local agencies in Tennessee, saying the goal was to find people it described as public safety threats. In September 2026, faith leaders from across East Tennessee published a letter opposing local participation in the 287(g) program.

=== Memphis ===
In September 2025, Governor Lee agreed to a federal law enforcement deployment to Memphis, known as the Memphis Safe Task Force. As of February 2026, more than 1,500 federal agents were working there alongside state troopers and the Tennessee National Guard, according to Mother Jones.

=== Effects on communities ===
Reporting in February 2026 described declining school enrollment and reduced sales at Latino-owned businesses in South Nashville after the May 2025 operation. In January 2026, Republican legislators introduced further immigration bills, including proposals that would require some public employees to report suspected undocumented immigrants. They would allow schools to check students' immigration status.

=== Immigrant population ===
The American Immigration Council estimated that about 157,000 Tennessee residents were undocumented in 2023, out of roughly 430,000 foreign-born residents. These figures cover all immigrants, not only Latinos.
