= José María Callava =

Governor of Spanish West Florida

17th Governor of West Florida
- In office February 1819 – July 17, 1821
- Preceded by: William King
- Succeeded by: Andrew Jackson as Military Governor of American Florida

Personal details
- Profession: Soldier and Politician

Military service
- Allegiance: Viceroyalty of New Spain; Kingdom of Spain
- Branch/service: Spanish Army
- Rank: Colonel
- Battles/wars: Peninsular War

José María Callava was the final governor of Spanish West Florida, serving from February 1819 to the time of Spain's transfer of the territory to the United States on 17 July 1821. Callava was an officer in the Spanish military who had been rapidly promoted due to his service in the Peninsular War — the Battle of Almonacid in particular, for which he was knighted into the Royal and Military Order of Saint Hermenegild in 1811. He became a colonel and governor in February 1819, before he reached the age of 40.

James Parton's Life of Andrew Jackson describes Callava thus: He was a Castilian, of a race akin to the Saxon, of light complexion, a handsome, well-grown man, of dignified presence and refined manners.

After the transfer of Florida to the United States as part of the Adams–Onís Treaty, Callava remained for a time in Pensacola acting as a representative of Spain and overseeing the embarkation of artillery and other unfinished business. During this time, Callava came into conflict with Andrew Jackson, the newly appointed military commissioner and governor of the Florida Territory, due to a dispute over the estate of Nicolás María Vidal, a Spanish official in Louisiana and Florida. Callava was ordered to hand over documents related to the disposition of the estate to Vidal's daughters by Eufrosina Hinard; when he did not comply, Jackson had him jailed and had the records removed from Callava's house. Jackson sent Captain Francis Dade to apprehend Callava.

Once the records were in American hands, Jackson released Callava. Callava blamed the dispute, in part, on a lack of translators to aid in communication between himself and the Americans. Following his release, Callava headed to Washington to lodge a formal complaint against Jackson through the Spanish minister. Callava also published in Havana a manifesto outlining the "outrages and vexations" (tropelías y vejaciones) committed against him by Jackson.
