= Fort Terán =

Former Mexican military post

Coordinates: 31°01′44″N 94°28′05″W

Fort Terán (sometimes Teran or Fort Turan) was a former Mexican military post and Texian settlement located in Tyler County in East Texas. The post was named after Mexican general Manuel Mier y Terán.

Fort Terán was located at the head of navigation on the Neches River. The flat rock along the riverbed allowed it be crossed by three major trails between Mexican Texas and the United States: the Alabama Trace, the Coushatta Trace, and the Orcoquisac Trace (or Liberty-Nacogdoches Road). As these trails avoided the royal Old San Antonio and Atascosita Roads, they were frequented by smugglers and illegal American immigrants.

Following Terán's inspection tour of Texas, the fort was constructed in 1830 as part of an implementation of Mexican President Anastasio Bustamante's edict banning further American immigration or the importation of further slaves into the territory. Colonel Ellis Bean built and commanded the fort between 1831 and 1832. Almost immediately, most of the troops were transferred south, as the government reduced funding and attempted to resist Santa Anna's rebellion. The remaining soldiers were removed in 1835.

During the Battle of Nacogdoches, in the early stages of the Texan Revolution, the Mexican garrison at Fort Nacogdoches fled south past the site, where they were intercepted by a band of Texian rebels. As the custom, rumors of the hidden or abandoned gold led to a number of excavations at the site, including one in 1954 where a man was killed by a premature explosion of his dynamite.

After the Battle of San Jacinto led to de facto Texan independence, Samuel Belt operated a ferry and trading post at the site, which developed into a small community on the roads connecting Nacogdoches, Houston, and Jasper. It continued to function as a steamer port and stagecoach crossing until the advent of railroads.

The site is now abandoned. The nearest town is Rockland on U.S. Route 69. There is an historical marker that is accessible only with four-wheel drive.

== See also ==
- Forts of Texas
- Manuel Mier y Terán

== Sources ==
- Arrowsmith, John. Map of Texas, compiled from Surveys recorded in the Land Office of Texas, and other Official Surveys. Soho Square, London, 1844.
- Donovan, Richard. Paddling the Wild Neches. Texas A&M University Press, 2006.
- Howard N. Martin: Fort Teran from the Handbook of Texas Online. Retrieved 4 February 2010.
- Marler, Don. Fort Terán on the Neches River. Dogwood Press, 2000.
- Marler, Don. "Ft. Teran Site Visit July 1998." Sons of DeWitt Colony Texas website. Retrieved: 4 February 2010.
