= Francisco Luis Héctor de Carondelet =

Governor of El Salvador, Louisiana and West Florida

The Most Excellent Infantry Colonel Francisco Luis Héctor de Carondelet 5th Baron Carondelet
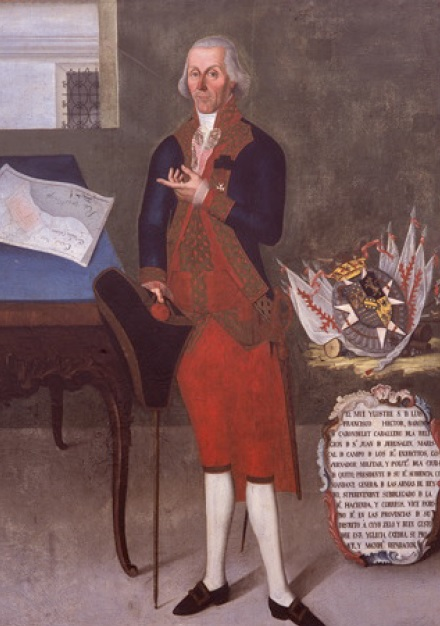
- Portrait by unknown artist

2nd Colonial Intendant of San Salvador
- In office 11 June 1789 – 1791
- Monarch: Charles IV
- First Secretary of State: Count of Floridablanca
- Viceroy of New Spain: Juan Vicente de Güemes
- Governor of Guatemala: Bernardo de Troncoso y Martínez del Rincón
- Preceded by: José Ortiz de la Peña
- Succeeded by: José Antonio María de Aguilar

7th Spanish Governor of Louisiana Governor and Captain General of West Florida
- In office 30 November 1791 – 5 August 1797
- Monarch: Charles IV
- First Secretary of State: Count of Floridablanca; Count of Aranda (as interim); Manuel Godoy
- Viceroy of New Spain: Juan Vicente de Güemes; Miguel de la Grúa Talamanca
- Governor of Cuba: Luis de las Casas; Juan Procopio Bassecourt
- Preceded by: Esteban Rodríguez Miró
- Succeeded by: Manuel Gayoso de Lemos

27th President of the Real Audiencia of Quito
- In office 1799–1807
- Monarch: Charles IV
- First Secretary of State: Mariano Luis de Urquijo; Pedro Cevallos Guerra
- Viceroy of New Granada: Pedro Mendinueta y Múzquiz; Antonio José Amar y Borbón
- Preceded by: Luis Antonio de Guzmán
- Succeeded by: Manuel Ruiz Urriés de Castilla

Personal details
- Born: Francisco Luis Héctor de Carondelet y Bosoist; July 29, 1748 Noyelles-sur-Selle, French Flanders, France
- Died: August 10, 1807 (aged 59) Quito, New Granada, Spanish Empire
- Resting place: Cathedral of Quito
- Spouse: María Concepción Castaños Aragorri Uriarte y Olavide
- Children: Luis Carondelet Castaños; María Felipa Cayetana de Carondelet y Castaños
- Parent(s): Jean Louis de Carondelet and Marie Angélique Bernarde de Rasoir

Military service
- Allegiance: (Spanish Empire) Viceroyalty of New Spain; Spain
- Branch/service: Spanish Army
- Years of service: 1763–1787
- Rank: Infantry Colonel
- Battles/wars: Invasion of Algiers (1775) American Revolutionary War: Siege of Pensacola

Francisco Luis Héctor de Carondelet y Bosoist, 5th Baron of Carondelet (1748–1807) was a Spanish administrator of partial Burgundian descent in the employ of the Spanish Empire. He was a Knight of Malta.

== Biography ==
=== Youth and military career ===
Carondelet entered the service of the King of Spain in 1762, at age fifteen. By 1781, he commanded the IV Division, which fought at the Siege of Pensacola in 1781. Upon his return to Spain in 1787, he was attached to the Flandres Regimiento, with the rank of Infantry Colonel, and was received in the Order of Malta. During this period he married, against his own family's will, a woman from Aragón whose family was very influential at the royal court, Maria Concepción Castaños y Aragorri.

=== Governor of El Salvador (1789 – 1791) ===
Carondelet was named governor of El Salvador in 1789. Because the local indigenous population working in the indigo industry had declined greatly, Carondolet recruited Spanish laborers. Their descendants are among the blonde and fair-skinned people of today's Chalatenango Department.

=== Governor of Louisiana (1791 – 1797) ===
After his term as governor of El Salvador ended he was appointed governor of the Spanish colonies of Louisiana and West Florida, from 1791 to 1797. As French was his mother tongue, he was well regarded by the French Creole population. He established Louisiana's first newspaper, Le Moniteur. He made many improvements in the infrastructure of New Orleans, including the Carondelet Canal and the city's first street lighting. The street light tenders (attendants) served as watchmen and de facto municipal police.

About 1793, he granted land near Cape Girardeau, Missouri, to the Black Bob Band of Hathawekela Shawnee.

==== U.S. expansion ====
Carondelet became concerned about westward U.S. expansion and was involved in the West Florida Controversy, which concerned the border between West Florida and the United States. He wanted to thwart the American policy of trying to secure unchallenged access to the Mississippi River, a goal which made Spanish colonial officials fear for the independence of Louisiana and New Spain. Working through an alliance with Native American tribes, Carondelet succeeded in thwarting westward American expansion for several years.

However, the U.S. finally gained ratification (1795) of Pinckney's Treaty, also known as the Treaty of San Lorenzo. It established intentions of friendship between the U.S. and Spain and defined the boundaries between the U.S. and the Spanish colonies. The treaty guaranteed the United States navigation rights on the Mississippi River.

==== Slave code ====
Upon taking up his post he had to deal with the Mina uprising in the vicinity of New Roads. Having assumed office just after the first stages of the Haitian Revolution, Carondelet was concerned that mistreatment of slaves might provoke additional rebellions in Louisiana; hence, he promptly introduced a slave code giving some protection to the slaves, which prescribed standards for quantity and quality of food and clothing.

This initiative created a certain amount of tension between him and the slaveholders. Carondelet responded by developing a stronger relationship with the slave and free-colored populations. He commissioned 29 free men of color in the militia and was proud of the three companies he formed with soldiers of African descent.

=== President of the Real Audiencia de Quito (Ecuador) (1799 – 1807) ===
After his term in Louisiana, Carondelet served as President of the Real Audiencia de Quito from 1799 through his death in 1807, supervising territory including present-day Ecuador, parts of Peru and Colombia. He was known as a moderate person who refrained from the arrogance and arbitrary behavior so often associated with functionaries. In 1803 he assisted the naturalists Alexander von Humboldt and Aimé Bonpland during their visit to Quito. An educated man with progressive interests, he also helped the naturalist and geographer Francisco José de Caldas and the orator José Mejía Lequerica.

In 1803, Indian insurrections took place in Guamote, Columbe and Yaruquies. Carondolet awarded the Cacique de Licán, José Leandro Zepla y Oro, with a position as the Regidor del Cabildo de Riobamba in 1805, for his loyalty during these uprisings. Carondolet improved the road to Guayaquil and was a patron of the construction of the dome of the Cathedral of Quito. After his death on August 10, 1807, he was interred at the Cathedral.

== Namesakes in North and South America ==
- The Carondelet Canal in New Orleans was constructed on his orders and named for him. (It was filled in during the 1930s, with its turning basin the origin for the name of Basin Street.)
- Carondelet Street in New Orleans
  - Carondelet Farm in San Diego, California, named after the New Orleans Street
- Carondelet Street in Mandeville, Louisiana
- Carondelet, a neighborhood in St. Louis, Missouri
- Carondelet Drive in Kansas City, MO (named for the St. Joseph Medical Center (Kansas City, Missouri), originally founded by Sisters of St. Joseph of Carondelet from St. Louis, Missouri)
- Fort Carondelet, a fort located on the Osage River in Vernon County, Missouri
- Carondelet Presidential Palace in Quito, Ecuador
- Carondelet Street in Dallas, TX. No longer exists. When the railroads entered Dallas after 1872, trackage rights in lower North Dallas affected several pioneer streets. Carondelet was chopped off and closed on its way to the river bank to permit the Missouri-Kansas-Texas Railroad to build yards and station facilities. The stub end of the street from Market eastward then lost its name when it became a part of Ross Avenue.

Political offices
Preceded by José Ortiz de la Peña	Spanish Governor of San Salvador; 1789–1791	Succeeded by José Antonio María de Aguilar
Preceded by Esteban Rodríguez Miró	Spanish Governor of Louisiana; 1791–1797	Succeeded by Manuel Gayoso de Lemos
