= Manuel Gayoso de Lemos =

Spanish governor of Louisiana

The Most Excellent Manuel Gayoso de Lemos KOM OTS
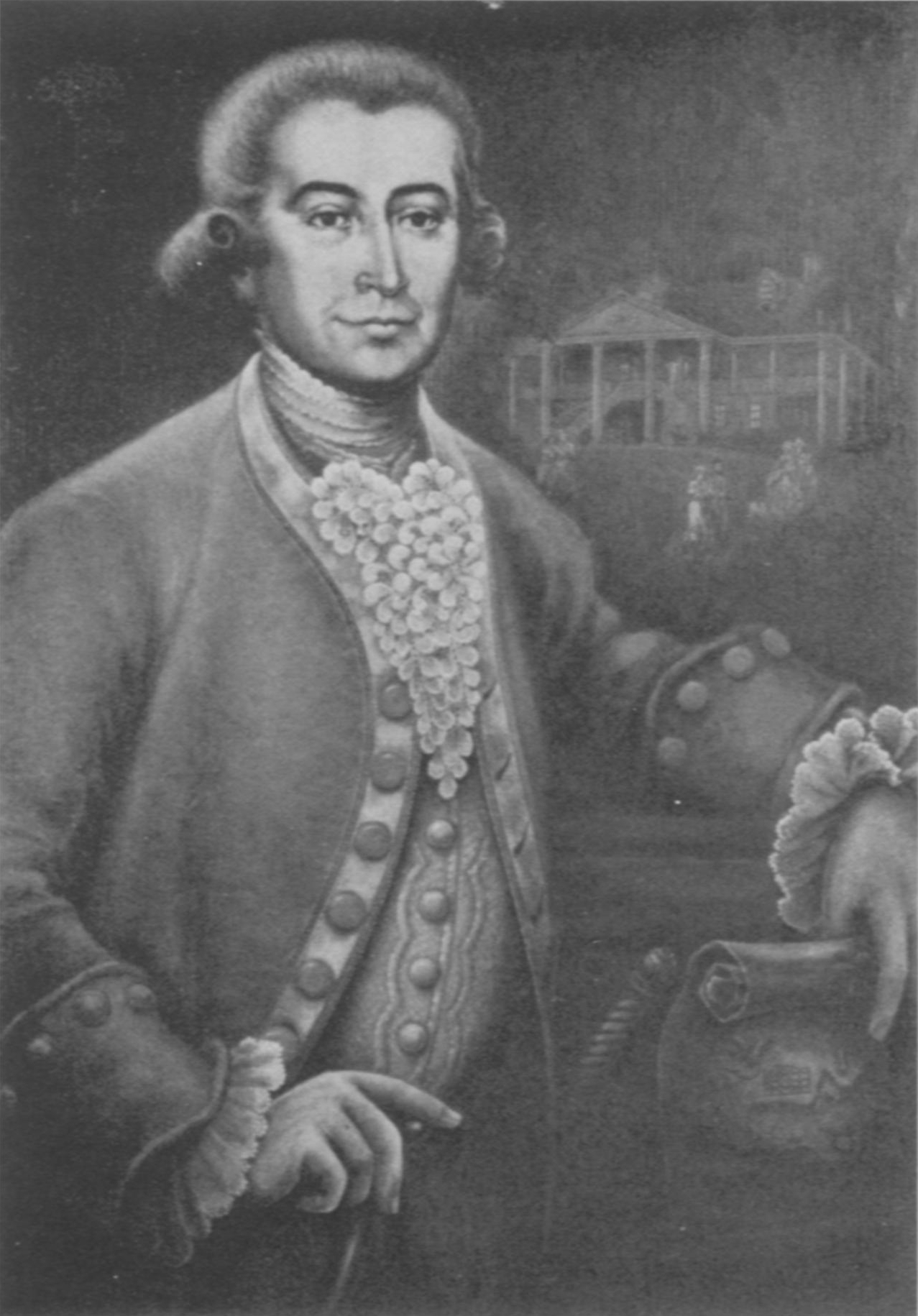
- Posthumous portrait by P. J. de Lemos

8th Spanish Governor of Louisiana Governor and Captain General of West Florida
- In office 5 August 1797 – 18 July 1799
- Monarch: Charles IV
- First Secretary of State: Manuel Godoy; Francisco de Saavedra
- Viceroy of New Spain: Miguel de la Grúa Talamanca
- Captain General of Cuba: Juan Procopio Bassecourt y Bryas
- Preceded by: Francisco Luis Héctor de Carondelet
- Succeeded by: Francisco Bouligny

Personal details
- Born: Manuel Luis Gayoso de Lemos Amorín y Magallanes; May 30, 1747 Porto, Portugal
- Died: July 18, 1799 (aged 52) New Orleans, Louisiana, Spanish Empire
- Spouses: Theresa Margarita Hopman y Pereira (m. 1787; died 1789) Elizabeth Watts (m. 1792; died 1792) Margaret Cyrilla Watts (m. 1797)

Military service
- Allegiance: Viceroyalty of New Spain; Spain
- Branch/service: Spanish Army
- Years of service: 1771–1779
- Rank: Brigadier

Don Manuel Luis Gayoso de Lemos y Amorín KOM OTS (May 30, 1747 – July 18, 1799) was the governor of Spanish Louisiana from 1797 until his death in 1799.

== Biography ==
=== Early years and military career ===
Born in Porto, Portugal, on May 30, 1747, to Spanish consul Manuel Luis Gayoso de Lemos y Sarmiento and Theresa Angélica de Amorín y Magallanes, he received his education in London, where his parents were living.

At age 23 Manuel Gayoso de Lemos joined the Spanish Lisbon Regiment as a cadet (1771), and he was commissioned ensign (sub-lieutenant) the following year. The Lisbon Regiment had been reassigned from Havana to New Orleans following since Spain assumed control of Louisiana under Field Marshal Alejandro O'Reilly in 1769. Throughout his life, Gayoso de Lemos retained his military rank and he was a brigadier at the time of his death.

On November 3, 1787, Gayoso de Lemos assumed military and civil command of the fort and the newly organized Natchez District, having been appointed district governor by Governor-General Esteban Rodríguez Miró following the defeat of the British in West Florida. On his arrival, Gayoso de Lemos established an informal cabildo (council) of landed planters, which was formalized in 1792. Most of the council were of non-Spanish origin having come down from the Ohio River Valley settlements (especially Kentucky). Gayoso de Lemos continued to encourage American settlement on Spanish soil, especially by Catholics, notably the Irish and the Scots, and by those who brought significant property. He moved the administrative part of the town of Natchez from the waterfront up onto the bluff. One of the most troubling aspects during his civil administration was confusion in the land titles, with a number of inconsistent land grants. Rodríguez Miró's successor, Governor-General Francisco Luis Héctor de Carondelet was not amenable to rectifying the problem.

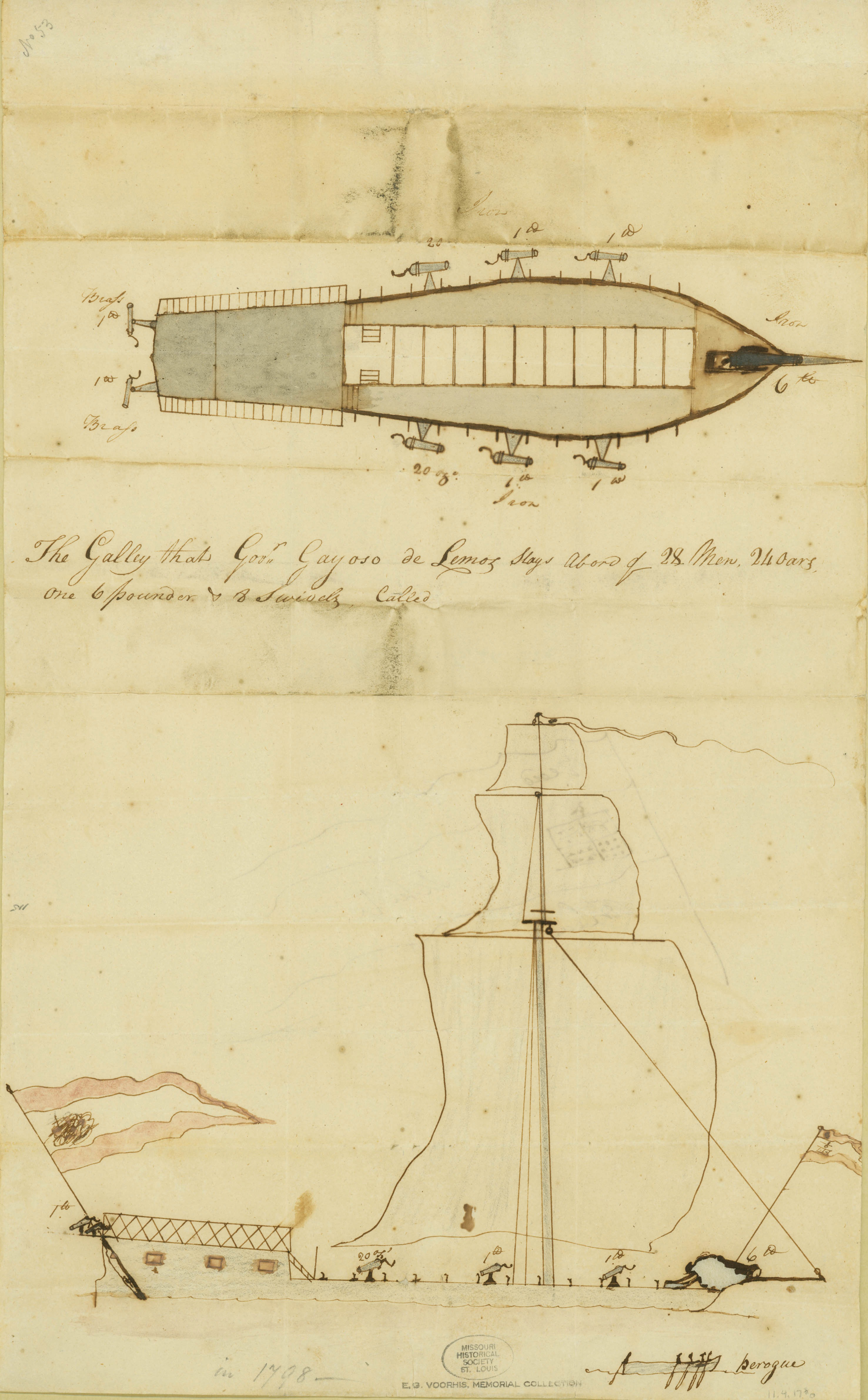
Pen and ink sketch of the galley of Governor Gayoso de Lemos by William Clark, October 1795

While in Natchez, Gayoso de Lemos used the greed of a number of Americans, notably General James Wilkinson and Philip Nolan, to help limit the growth of the United States. Also to this end, Gayoso de Lemos entered into alliances with local Native American tribes and signed formal treaties with them, most notably the 1793 Treaty of Nogales establishing offensive and defensive alliances with the Chickasaw, Muscogee, Talapuche, Alabama, Cherokee, and Choctaw nations. Under his direction the Spanish fortified the Mississippi at Fort Nogales (later Walnut Hills, then Vicksburg) at Fort San Fernando on the Chickasaw Bluffs (later Memphis). He was instrumental in acquiring the information from Wilkinson concerning the proposed U.S. attack on New Orleans in 1793 by General George Rogers Clark.

However, under the terms of Pinckney's Treaty in 1796, Spain agreed to relinquish the Natchez District to the United States. Gayoso de Lemos oversaw the gradual Spanish withdrawal from the east side of the middle Mississippi River. In March 1797, the Fort Nogales was decommissioned, with the troops and stores being moved to St. Louis. Final evacuation of the district did not occur until 1798, at which time the U.S. established the Mississippi Territory.

=== Governor of Louisiana ===
Gayoso de Lemos succeeded Carondelet as Governor-General of Louisiana on August 5, 1797. His first act was to issue a Bando de Buen Gobierno (Edict of Good Government) and to send a list of instructions to commandants of all posts concerning land grants.

As governor, Gayoso de Lemos consolidated the military power of Spain in New Orleans, still fearing a possible thrust south by Britain and desiring to keep Spanish Louisiana as buffer between the U.S. and Spanish Texas. He was pragmatic and continued the unofficial policy of allowing Americans to bring their slaves with them from the north, although the importation of new slaves had been prohibited by Spain since 1792. However, he was dogmatic in other areas of government; in 1798, he issued a comprehensive edict concerning Catholicism as the state faith of the colony. In addition to increasing formal church membership, it attempted to coerce people to give up unnecessarily working on Sundays and holy days. In the edict, Gayoso de Lemos condemned anyone who challenged the theology or social centrality of the Church. In 1798 he also instituted state-run garbage collection (a novel idea at the time) to prevent the spread of diseases and bad smells in the city.

Gayoso de Lemos died in New Orleans of yellow fever on July 18, 1799, and his remains were interred in the Saint Louis Cathedral. Col. Francisco Bouligny became the acting military governor and Nicolás María Vidal the acting civil governor. Gayoso Bayou, a partially covered stream in Memphis, Tennessee, is named after Manuel Gayoso.

=== Personal life ===
Gayoso de Lemos married three times. His first marriage was to Theresa Margarita Hopman y Pereira of Lisbon, with whom he had two children. In 1792 he married Elizabeth Watts of Philadelphia and Louisiana; she died three months later. He then married Elizabeth's sister, Margaret Cyrilla Watts, with whom he had one son.

Preceded by Francisco Luis Héctor de Carondelet	Spanish Governor of Louisiana; 1797-1799	Succeeded by Francisco Bouligny (military); Nicolás María Vidal (civil)
