= Peter Ellis Bean =

- Born: June 8, 1783; Bean Station, Tennessee, U.S.
- Died: October 3, 1846 (aged 63); Veracruz, Mexico

Peter Ellis Bean (sometimes Ellis Peter Bean; Spanish: Pedro Elias Bean; June 8, 1783 – October 3, 1846) was a United States filibuster in Texas and Mexico, and a Mexican revolutionary.

== Early life ==
Bean was born on June 8, 1783, to William Bean and Elizabeth Blair in Grainger County, Tennessee. Bean was the first born child from his father's second marriage, and he had seven siblings and several half-siblings. He grew up in the Cumberland Mountains in eastern Tennessee, and his grandfather had established a settlement known as Bean's Station.

In the few years leading to Bean's birth, several men from his family waged war against the British with long rifles, including his grandfather, Captain William Bean, who died in 1782. They also seized land from the Cherokees as they advanced into Tennessee's frontier.

== Expedition to Spanish Texas ==
In 1800, at 17 years of age, his father sent him south to the Mississippi River via the Tennessee River by flatboat with a load of trade goods. The boat capsized at Muscle Shoals, Alabama, and Bean escaped with nothing but his clothes. He continued on to Natchez, Mississippi, where he joined Philip Nolan's last filibustering expedition to Spanish Texas, on the promise of riches from captured mustangs and perhaps gold and silver.

On May 21, 1801, a Spanish force of 120 men under the command of Lieutenant Miguel Francisco Múzquiz left Nacogdoches in pursuit of Nolan, whom they encountered entrenched and unwilling to surrender just upstream from where the current Nolan River flows into the larger Brazos (now in Hill County, Texas). Several of Nolan's men surrendered immediately, and after Nolan was killed, the remainder yielded. Bean opposed surrender, but Múzquiz promised the prisoners would be taken to Natchez and released. A first-hand account of the expedition, capture and subsequent imprisonment is contained in Bean's Memoirs. Bean was second in command of the expedition.

== In Mexico ==
Instead of Natchez, Bean and the other survivors were taken deep into Mexico, and held at various towns. Bean tried several times to escape. As punishment, he was once held in stocks for fifteen days. The men finally arrived in Chihuahua, where they were held for five or six days in prison, but then granted freedom of the town. The names and fates of the other prisoners are unknown, but thanks to his memoirs, Bean's story has survived.

In Chihuahua, Bean went into business as a hatter, doing well. After five years, Bean and some other prisoners attempted to escape through New Mexico, but were recaptured. Bean was sent to the prison in Acapulco. He remained in prison there until November 1811, when he was released after volunteering to fight for the Spanish Royalists against the insurgents under General José María Morelos, who was besieging Acapulco. However, at the first opportunity Bean deserted, joining Morelos, and helping in the latter's capture of the town. Bean rose in rank and favor in the insurgent army, in large part because of his knowledge of munitions. He established several powder mills and furnaces for casting cannons.

== Return to the United States ==
Fifteen years after leaving the United States, Bean returned as a Mexican colonel and emissary from Morelos to seek American aid for the insurgents, but without much success. In New Orleans he encountered the pirate Jean Lafitte, and together they offered their services to General Andrew Jackson in the Battle of New Orleans against the British. They were assigned positions in the American battle line. Their valiant conduct gained a pardon for Lafitte, and promises of help for the Mexican insurgents for Bean.

On February 18, 1815, Bean sailed on the Águila to return to Mexico, but he soon was sent back to New Orleans as the escort of the Mexican emissary to the United States, José Manuel Herrera, and Morelos's son, Juan Almonte. By the time Bean got back to Mexico, Morelos had been captured and shot. The insurrection was in desperate straits. Bean raised money and tried to gather mules and stock for the patriot army.

Bean married Magdalena Falfán de los Godos, a lady of "fine family", intending to return with her to the United States. However, in 1816 Bean was nearly captured by Royalists in Veracruz. He managed to get back to New Orleans, but by mutual consent his wife remained in Mexico. The details of this escape are not given in his memoirs. He stayed in the Neutral Ground (between the Louisiana Purchase, belonging to the United States, and Spanish colonial New Spain), working on his memoirs. In 1817 he decided to visit relatives in Tennessee. There in 1818 he married Candace Midkiff, daughter of Isaac Midkiff, either assuming his Mexican wife was dead, or simply not mentioning her. In 1820 the couple moved to southwest Arkansas, where their son, Isaac Bean, was born in 1821.

== Return to Mexico ==
With news of Mexican independence, in 1823 Bean moved with his family to Nacogdoches, Texas, intending to seek reward for his revolutionary services. He settled in Mound Prairie, near the Neches River on the Old San Antonio Road. In 1825 Bean went to Mexico City, where he received a land grant and was commissioned as a colonel in the Mexican army. He was also appointed agent to the Cherokees and other immigrant tribes in East Texas. He applied for colonization rights to the border reserve along the Sabine River, but Mexico awarded them to Lorenzo de Zavala instead, in 1829.

While he was back in Mexico, Bean renewed his relations with his first wife, Magdalena Falfán, but kept his home with his second wife, Candace Midkiff, in Texas. He eventually had three children with Candace.

== Back in Texas ==
Bean settled down to discharge his duties as Indian agent. He was instrumental in defusing the Fredonian Rebellion in Texas in 1826, by keeping the Cherokees neutral. He briefly commanded a small military force at Fort Terán in 1831 and helped overthrow the centralist commandant at Nacogdoches in 1832, becoming the interim Mexican military chief in East Texas.

Although he probably sympathized with the Texas Revolution, Bean was after all an officer in the Mexican army. He took no active part in the revolution, and volunteered to place himself under arrest when the fighting began. He was initially granted parole, but General Sam Houston ordered him detained in April 1836.

After Texas gained independence, Bean continued to live around Nacogdoches until 1843, when he returned to Jalapa, Veracruz and his first wife. He died in bed at her estate in 1847, at age 63. His second wife and the mother of his children, Candace Midkiff, died in 1848. She is buried in Selman-Roark Cemetery at Linwood.

Although uneducated, Peter Ellis Bean was a natural leader. At the time of his death he owned considerable property in East Texas. He was well thought of by the people who knew him. (See The Peter Ellis Bean Collection at Stephen F. Austin State University.)

== Bibliography ==
- Jackson, Jack (2005). Indian Agent: Peter Ellis Bean in Mexican Texas. College Station: Texas A&M University Press. ISBN 1-58544-444-8.
