= List of colonial governors of Louisiana =

This is a list of the colonial governors of Louisiana, from the founding of the first settlement by the French in 1699 to the territory's acquisition by the United States in 1803.

The French and Spanish governors administered a territory which was much larger than the modern U.S. state of Louisiana, comprising Louisiana (New France) and Louisiana (New Spain), respectively. As part of the Third Treaty of San Ildefonso (1800), Spain retroceded Louisiana to the French Republic, but Spain continued to administer the territory until 1803 when French officials arrived shortly before the sale of Louisiana to the United States.

At the same time, there are parts of present-day Louisiana which were historically administered by other European powers, with the most prominent example being the area known as the Florida Parishes, north of Lake Pontchartrain and east of the Mississippi River. This territory was originally part of French Louisiana, but it was administered by the Kingdom of Great Britain from 1763 to 1783, following the British victory in the French and Indian War, and then by Spain from 1783 until the West Florida Revolt in 1810.

== List ==
=== French Louisiana (1682–1762) ===
#	Portrait	Name (Birth–Death)	Took office	Left office
1		Sauvolle (1671–1701)	1699	1701 (Died in office)
2		Jean-Baptiste Le Moyne de Bienville (1680–1767)	1701	1713
3		Antoine de la Mothe Cadillac (1658–1730)	1713	1716
4		Jean-Baptiste Le Moyne de Bienville (1680–1767)	1716	1717
5		Jean-Michel de Lepinay (c. 1665–1721)	1717	1718
6		Jean-Baptiste Le Moyne de Bienville (1680–1767)	1718	1724
7		Pierre Dugué de Boisbriand (1675–1736)	1724	1726
8		Étienne Perier (1686–1766)	1726	1733
9		Jean-Baptiste Le Moyne de Bienville (1680–1767)	1733	1743
10		Pierre de Rigaud de Vaudreuil-Cavagnial (1698–1778)	1743	1753
11		Louis Billouart (1704–1770)	1753	1763
12		Jean-Jacques Blaise d'Abbadie (1726–1765)	1763	1765 (Died in office)
13		Charles Philippe Aubry (c. 1720–1770)	1765	1768

=== Spanish Louisiana (1762–1803) ===
#	Portrait	Name (Birth–Death)	Took office	Left office
1		Antonio de Ulloa (1716–1795)	1766	1768
2		Charles Philippe Aubry (c. 1720–1770)	1768	1769
3		Alejandro O'Reilly (1722–1794)	1769	1769
4		Luis de Unzaga (1721–1790)	1770	1777
5		Bernardo de Gálvez (1746–1786)	1777	1785
6		Esteban Rodríguez Miró (1744–1795)	1785	1791
7		Francisco Luis Héctor de Carondelet (1748–1807)	1791	1797
8		Manuel Gayoso de Lemos (1747–1799)	1797	1799
9		Francisco Bouligny (1736–1800)	1799	1799
10		Sebastián Calvo de la Puerta y O'Farrill (1751–1820)	1799	1801
—		Nicolás María Vidal (Acting Civil Governor) (1739–1806)	1799	1801
11		Juan Manuel de Salcedo (1743–c. 1810)	1801	1803

=== French Republic Louisiana (1803–1803) ===
#	Portrait	Name (Birth–Death)	Took office	Left office
1		Pierre-Clément de Laussat (Note: Laussat was named colonial prefect in August 1802 and arrived in New Orleans on March 26, 1803, to prepare the territory for the arrival of Governor General Jean-Baptiste Bernadotte. However, news of the Sale of Louisiana reached Bernadotte before he set sail from La Rochelle in May 1803 and he refused the position. Spain officially transferred control of Louisiana to Laussat on November 30, 1803, and he oversaw the transfer of the territory to the United States on December 20, 1803.) (1756–1835)	1803	1803

== See also ==
- List of governors of Louisiana
- List of commandants of the Illinois Country
