= Eufrosina Hinard =

Eufrosina Hinard (also spelled Hisnard; 1777 – after 1819), was a businesswoman who lived in New Orleans and Pensacola, Spanish West Florida. Hinard, a free mixed-race woman, owned and bought slaves and allowed them to purchase their own freedom.

== Biography ==
Hinard was born in 1777 in New Orleans to a freed black slave. Her father was a free white man, and as Hinard's mother had been freed, Hinard was also born free.

In 1791, she was placéed to Nicolás María Vidal, a legal counselor to the governor of Spanish Louisiana. She had two daughters with Vidal: Carolina Maria Salome and Maria Josefa de las Mercedes.

Although Vidal was not listed on the children's baptism records, Hisnard and Vidal's daughters were accepted as part of Vidal's social circle without scandal.

Hinard and her daughters lived in New Orleans until 1803, when it was ceded to the French at which time they moved with Vidal to Pensacola, Spanish West Florida.

When Vidal died in 1806, he left his estate and his slaves to Hinard and her daughters. However, the executor of the estate, John Innerarity, over claims on Vidal's debts held by the Forbes & Co. Indian Trade Co., which Innerarity headed. The dispute was held up in court until 1821, after Mercedes and Caroline petitioned the new American governor, Andrew Jackson, to intervene in the case. Jackson eventually did intercede, but the final determination was that the Vidal's inheritance be used to pay off debts.

Hinard rented out her slaves and purchased more slaves. While it was becoming difficult, if not impossible, for slaves to purchase their own freedom from their owners in the United States, Hinard still allowed the practice with her own slaves after the cession of Spanish East and West Florida to the U.S. Hinard considered her slaveholding as a "business practice, not a human condition." Her slaves could pay their purchase price, plus interest, in order to earn their freedom. Hinard also owned a brickworks in Florida.

Hinard is the fourth-great-grandmother to Creole chef Leah Chase.
