= James Wilkinson =

American army officer and politician (1757–1825)

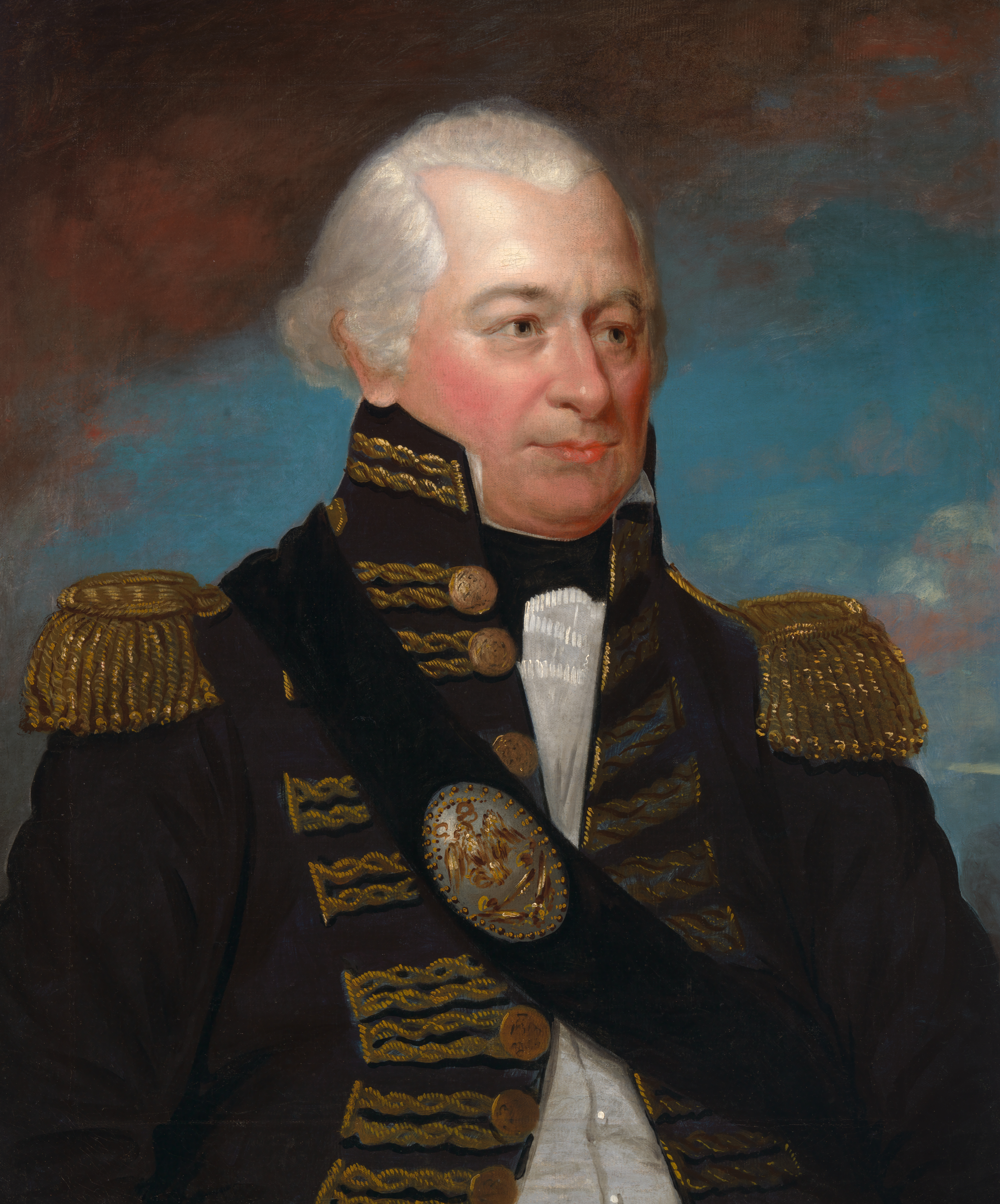
- Portrait, c. 1820

6th and 9th Senior Officer of the United States Army
- In office June 15, 1800 – January 27, 1812
- President: John Adams; Thomas Jefferson; James Madison
- Preceded by: Alexander Hamilton
- Succeeded by: Henry Dearborn
- In office December 15, 1796 – July 13, 1798
- President: George Washington; John Adams
- Preceded by: Anthony Wayne
- Succeeded by: George Washington

1st Governor of Louisiana Territory
- In office July 4, 1805 – March 3, 1807
- President: Thomas Jefferson
- Preceded by: William Henry Harrison (as Governor of the District of Louisiana)
- Succeeded by: Meriwether Lewis

United States Envoy to Mexico
- In office 1816–1825
- President: James Madison; James Monroe; John Quincy Adams
- Preceded by: John H. Robinson (as special diplomatic agent)
- Succeeded by: Joel Roberts Poinsett (as U.S. Minister)

Personal details
- Born: March 24, 1757 Charles County, Province of Maryland, British America
- Died: December 28, 1825 (aged 68) Mexico City, Mexican Republic
- Resting place: Church of San Miguel Arcángel, Mexico City, Mexico
- Party: Democratic-Republican
- Spouses: Ann Biddle Wilkinson (m. 1778; died 1807) Celestine Laveau Trudeau (m. 1810)
- Children: 6

Military service
- Allegiance: United States of America; Spain
- Branch/service: Continental Army; United States Army
- Rank: Brigadier General
- Battles/wars: American Revolutionary War; Siege of Boston; Invasion of Quebec; Battles of Saratoga; Northwest Indian War; Blackberry Campaign; Battle of Kenapacomaqua; Battle of Fallen Timbers; Quasi-War; War of 1812; Battle of Crysler's Farm; Battle of Lacolle Mills

James Wilkinson (March 24, 1757 – December 28, 1825) was an American army officer and politician who was associated with multiple scandals and controversies during his life, including the Burr conspiracy. He served in the Continental Army during the American Revolutionary War, but he was twice compelled to resign. He was twice the Senior Officer of the U.S. Army; was appointed to be the first governor in the newly acquired western lands of the Louisiana Purchase of 1803, later organized by the United States Congress and the third President, Thomas Jefferson as the Louisiana Territory in 1804–1812, west of the Mississippi River; and commanded two unsuccessful military invasion campaigns in the St. Lawrence River valley theater in Canada during the War of 1812.

He died while seeking to serve as an envoy diplomat in Mexico City, the capital of the newly declared independent Mexico. Four decades later in 1854, following extensive archival research in Spanish royal archives at Madrid, the American historian Charles Gayarré, found documents which exposed Wilkinson as having been a highly paid Spanish spy. In the years since Gayarré's research became public, Wilkinson has been savagely condemned by subsequent American academic historians and politicians. 26th President Theodore Roosevelt claimed "[I]n all our history, there is no more despicable character."

== Early life ==
James Wilkinson was born on March 24, 1757, the son of Joseph Wilkinson and Alethea (Heighe) Wilkinson. Wilkinson's birthplace was about three miles (5 km) northeast of Benedict, Charles County, Maryland, on a farm south of Hunting Creek in Calvert County.

Wilkinson's grandfather had been sufficiently wealthy to buy a large property known as Stoakley Manor in Calvert County. Even though James Wilkinson's family lived on a smaller estate than those of Maryland's elite, they still saw themselves as members of the higher social class. According to the historian Andro Linklater, Wilkinson grew up with the idea that "the image of respectability excused the reality of betrayal". His father inherited Stoakley Manor, but by then the family was in debt. Joseph Wilkinson died in 1763, and in 1764 Stoakley Manor was broken up and sold. Wilkinson's older brother, Joseph, inherited what was left of the manor property after his father died. As the second son, James Wilkinson inherited no land.

Wilkinson's father had left him with the last words "My son, if you ever put up with an insult, I will disinherit you." Andro Linklater argued that this upbringing led to Wilkinson's aggressive reaction toward perceived insults. Wilkinson's early education by a private tutor was funded by his maternal grandmother. His study of medicine at the University of Pennsylvania, also funded by his grandmother, was interrupted by the American Revolutionary War.

== Marriages ==
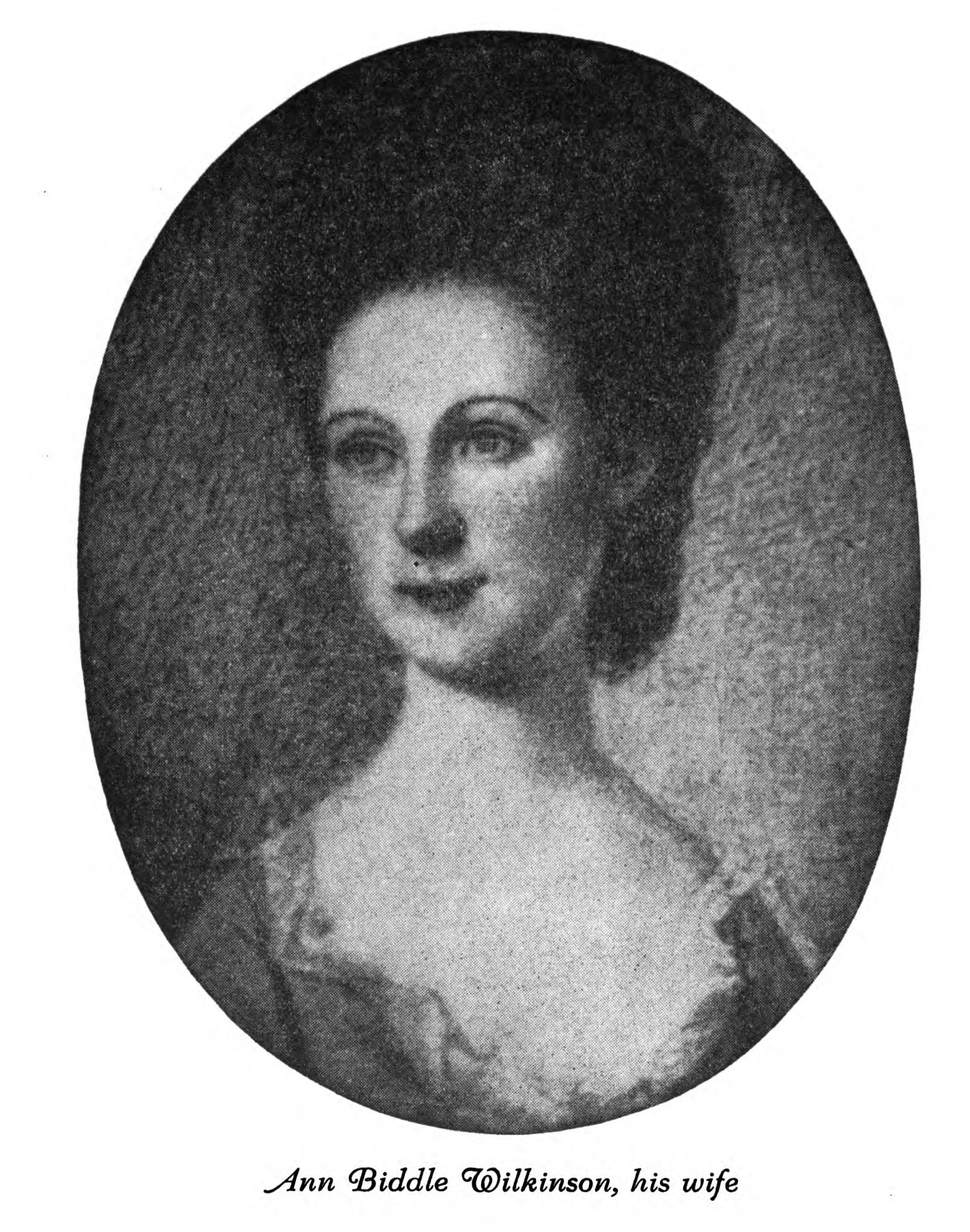
Ann Biddle Wilkinson

Wilkinson married Ann Biddle (1742–1807) of the prominent Biddle family of Philadelphia on November 12, 1778, in Philadelphia. She was a first cousin of Charles Biddle, an associate of Aaron Burr, and Wilkinson's marriage to the dynamic Biddle helped his career as a politician and general. She died on February 23, 1807.

The couple had four sons: John (1780–1796), James Biddle (c. 1783–1813), Joseph Biddle (1785–1865), and Walter (born 1791). James and Walter both served as captains in the U.S. Army.

On March 5, 1810, Wilkinson married Celestine Laveau Trudeau, widow of Thomas Urquhart and daughter of Charles Laveau Trudeau. They were the parents of twin girls Marie Isabel and Elizabeth Stephanie as well as a son, Theodore. Celestine's father, known in Louisiana as Don Carlos Trudeau, had served in the Spanish government of New Orleans. When the United States gained control of the city, he remained in New Orleans and anglicized his name.

Marie Isabel Wilkinson died in infancy. Elizabeth Stephanie Wilkinson (1816–1871) married Professor Toussaint Francois Bigot (1794–1869) in 1833. Theodore J. Wilkinson (1819–1853) resided in New Orleans.

== Revolutionary War service ==
Wilkinson first served in a Maryland militia unit in the summer of 1775. He then served in Thompson's Pennsylvania rifle battalion from September 1775 to March 1776, when he was commissioned as a captain in the 3rd New Hampshire Infantry, backdated to September 1775. He served as an aide to Nathanael Greene during the Siege of Boston and participated in the placing of guns on the Dorchester Heights in March 1776. Following the British evacuation of Boston, Wilkinson went with the rest of the Continental Army to New York, where he left Greene's staff and was given command of an infantry company in the 3rd New Hampshire.

Sent to Canada as part of the reinforcements for Benedict Arnold's army besieging Quebec, he arrived just in time to witness the arrival of 8,000 British troops under General John Burgoyne – which precipitated the defeat of the American invasion of Canada. He became aide to Arnold just prior to the final retreat and left Canada with Arnold on the very last boat out. In August 1776, he left Arnold's service and became an aide to General Horatio Gates.

When Gates sent him to Congress with official dispatches about the victory at the Battle of Saratoga in 1777, Wilkinson kept the Continental Congress waiting while he attended to personal affairs. When he arrived, he embellished his own role in the victory and was brevetted as a brigadier general on November 6, 1777, then appointed to the newly created Board of War. The promotion of a 20-year-old over more senior colonels caused an uproar among Continental officers, especially because Wilkinson's gossiping seemed to indicate he was a participant in the Conway Cabal, a conspiracy to replace George Washington with Horatio Gates as commander-in-chief of the Continental Army. Gates soon had enough of Wilkinson, and the young officer was compelled to resign in March 1778. On July 29, 1779, Congress appointed him clothier-general of the Army, but he resigned on March 27, 1781, due to his "lack of aptitude for the job".

== Kentucky ventures ==
After his resignation from the Continental Army, Wilkinson reluctantly became a brigadier general in the Pennsylvania militia in 1782 and also a state assemblyman in 1783, due to the wishes of George Washington. He moved to Kentucky (at that time, just three counties still belonging to Virginia) in 1784, and he was active there in efforts to achieve independence from Virginia. In Kentucky, Wilkinson in 1788 vigorously opposed the new U.S. Constitution. Kentucky had nearly achieved statehood under the old Articles of Confederation, and there was widespread disappointment when this was delayed because of the new constitution.

Leading up to Kentucky's seventh convention regarding separation from Virginia in November 1788, Wilkinson attempted to gauge the support for Kentucky to seek union with Spain. Wilkinson's ability to win people over with his charm and seeming sincerity got him elected committee chairman at the convention. He advocated for Kentucky to seek independence from Virginia first, and then to consider joining the Union of states as a second step. For many, joining the Union was conditional upon the Union negotiating with Spain to arrange free navigation on the Mississippi River, a contentious point which many doubted the eastern states would act upon.

Unable to gather enough support for his position at the convention, Wilkinson approached Spanish Governor Esteban Rodríguez Miró with a proposal. His intention was to obtain a grant of 60,000 acres (243 km^{2}) in the Yazoo lands, at the junction of the Yazoo River and the Mississippi (near present-day Vicksburg). The land was to serve as payment for Wilkinson's efforts on behalf of Spain, and to serve as a refuge in the event he and his supporters had to flee from the United States. Wilkinson asked for and received a pension of $7,000 from Miró, while requesting pensions on behalf of several prominent Kentuckians, including Harry Innes, Benjamin Sebastian, John Brown, Caleb Wallace, Benjamin Logan, Isaac Shelby, George Muter, George Nicholas, and even Humphrey Marshall (who at one time was a bitter rival of Wilkinson's).

By 1788, however, Wilkinson had apparently lost the confidence of officials in Spain. Miró was not to grant any of the proposed pensions and was forbidden from giving money to support a revolution in Kentucky. Nevertheless, Wilkinson continued to secretly receive funds from Spain for many years.

== Second military career ==
=== Northwest Indian War ===
In August 1791, Wilkinson led a raid intended to create a distraction that would aid General Arthur St. Clair's march north. In the Battle of Kenapacomaqua, Wilkinson killed 9 Wea and Miami and captured 34 Miami as prisoners, including a daughter of Miami war chief Little Turtle. Many of the confederation leaders were considering terms of peace to present to the United States, but when they received news of Wilkinson's raid, they readied for war. Wilkinson's raid thus had an effect opposite its intended one, uniting the tribes against St. Clair instead of distracting them. St. Clair's horrific defeat would take place shortly afterward.

=== Betrayal of Wayne ===
When the United States government reorganized the Army as the Legion of the United States, President George Washington was faced with the decision of whom to name as its commanding general. The two major candidates for this promotion were Wilkinson and Anthony Wayne. In the end, the cabinet chose Wayne due to Wilkinson's suspected involvement with the Spanish government. The cabinet promoted Wilkinson to brigadier general as consolation, since the president was aware of Wilkinson's fragile ego.

Wilkinson developed a jealousy of Wayne, but he maintained an ostensible respect toward the general. Throughout the Ohio campaign, Wilkinson secretly tried to undermine him. Wilkinson wrote anonymous negative letters to local newspapers about Wayne and spent years writing negative letters to politicians in Washington, D.C. Wilkinson also urged contractors not to perform, in the hope that Wayne's campaign would fail and that he would be appointed to replace Wayne. Wilkinson's refusal of an invitation to Wayne's Christmas party also created suspicion. Wayne eventually developed a full-fledged hatred for Wilkinson, after receiving a tip from Henry Knox. In August 1794, Wayne had led the Legion against the Indians in the Battle of Fallen Timbers; the battle was a significant victory for the United States, yet Wilkinson had criticized Wayne's actions during the battle, simply to antagonize him.

Wilkinson proceeded to file formal complaints against Wayne and his decisions to President Washington. Upon finding out about the complaints against him, Wayne decided to launch an investigation into Wilkinson's history with the Spanish. During all of this time, Wilkinson had renewed his secret alliance with the Spanish government (through the Governor of Louisiana, Francisco Luis Héctor de Carondelet), alerting them to the actions of both the U.S. and the French occupancy in North America. When Spanish couriers were intercepted carrying payments for Wilkinson, Wayne's suspicions were confirmed, and he attempted to court-martial Wilkinson for his treachery. However, Wayne developed a stomach ulcer and died on December 15, 1796; there was no court-martial. Instead, Wilkinson began his first tenure as Senior Officer of the Army, which lasted for about a year and a half. He continued to pass on intelligence to the Spanish in return for large sums in gold, but most of his information was of little value. Wilkinson claimed credit for undermining George Rogers Clark's plan to become "Major General in the Armies of France and Commander-in-chief of the French Revolutionary Legion on the Mississippi River" and for preventing supplies from being shipped down the Ohio River. He submitted receipts of $8,640 to the Spanish governor Carondelet for his efforts.

=== Quasi-War with France ===
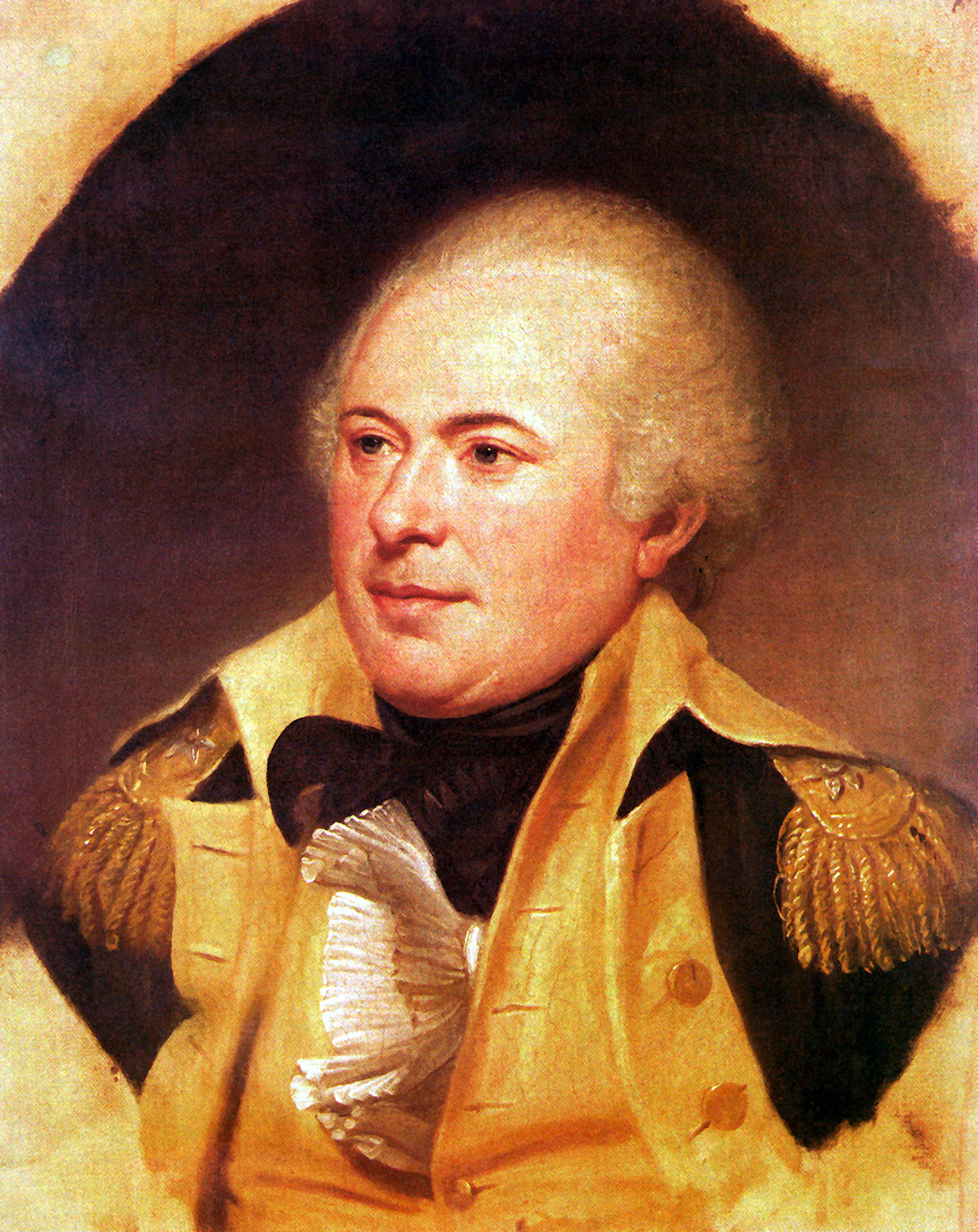
Portrait by Charles Willson Peale, c. 1797

Wilkinson was transferred to the southern frontier in 1798. During the Quasi-War crisis of the late 1790s between France and the United States, he was given the third-place rank in the U.S. Army behind George Washington (who, having been succeeded as president by Adams, died in December 1799) and Alexander Hamilton. Among other duties, Wilkinson was charged by Hamilton with establishing a "Reserve Corps" of American troops in the lower Ohio River Valley, who would seize the lower Mississippi River Valley and New Orleans in the event of war with France and her ally Spain.

Despite the end of the crisis in mid-1800 and Hamilton's being discharged from the Army, Wilkinson, for unknown reasons, continued the plan for the establishment of the base, which he named "Cantonment Wilkinson" after himself. Located in the Indiana Territory (now southern Illinois), the base operated from January 1801 to late 1802 before finally being abandoned. Archaeologists from Southern Illinois University have located the remains of this base, which is producing much previously unknown information and artifacts from the daily life of the frontier army.

Wilkinson served his second, longer term as Senior Officer of the Army from June 15, 1800, until January 27, 1812, when former Secretary of War Henry Dearborn was promoted to major general over Wilkinson.

On 30 April 1801, Wilkinson issued an order to remove all queues or pigtails, which had been worn in the army since the Revolution. This order was highly unpopular with both officers and men, leading to several desertions and threats of resignation. One senior officer, Lieutenant Colonel Thomas Butler, was eventually court-martialed in 1803 for failing to cut his hair. Andrew Jackson, who "loathed Wilkinson", took up Butler's cause and sent a series of letters on the matter to Thomas Jefferson, who ultimately declined to intervene.

=== Service under President Jefferson ===
Wilkinson remained senior officer of the United States Army under President Thomas Jefferson. Along with Mississippi and Orleans territorial governor William C. C. Claiborne, Wilkinson shared the honor of taking possession of the Louisiana Purchase on behalf of the United States on December 20, 1803. At this time, Wilkinson renewed his treasonous relationship with Spanish colonial officials, offering advice to them on how to contain American expansion in exchange for the restoration of his pension. Among other things, Wilkinson tipped off the Spanish to the object of the Lewis and Clark Expedition and provided advice to the Marquess of Casa Calvo to aid in his negotiations over the Texas–Louisiana border. Wilkinson also provided advice to the Spanish on how to intercept at least two other Jefferson-sponsored expeditions to explore the Louisiana Purchase.

Wilkinson also served as the designated United States Indian agent in the south at this time and negotiated the Treaty of Chickasaw Bluffs with the Chickasaw, signed October 24, 1801, and the Treaty of Fort Adams with the Choctaw, signed December 17, 1801, as well as the Treaty of Fort Confederation in 1802 and the Treaty of Hoe Buckintoopa (signed August 31, 1803).

=== Territorial Governor of Louisiana ===
Wilkinson was appointed by President Jefferson to be the first governor of Louisiana Territory in the spring of 1805, with an additional salary of $2,000. His secretary, Dr. Joseph Brown, was the brother-in-law of Vice President Aaron Burr, and they were headquartered in St. Louis.

=== Connections with Aaron Burr ===
In 1804–05, Wilkinson met in person with Aaron Burr, and they exchanged letters regarding Burr's conspiracy. After Burr's arrest, he claimed he was leading a group of settlers to take up residence on land in Texas which he had leased from the Spanish government in Mexico. The government charged Burr with treason and claimed he intended to separate the western states and territories from the United States and establish an independent nation.

Since Wilkinson was both the senior brigadier general of the United States Army and the Louisiana governor, Burr cultivated his support. In 1806 Burr is supposed to have sent a coded, unsigned letter (the "Cipher Letter", which Burr later denied having written) to Wilkinson, which stated that he was ready to commence his movement to Texas. Burr's subsequent efforts to recruit participants in his plans became public, raising fears that he was conspiring with England to start a war with Spain. Wilkinson became fearful that his role in Burr's plans and/or his spying for Spain would be exposed. In October 1806 Wilkinson sent to President Jefferson a letter in which he painted Burr's actions in the worst possible light, while portraying himself as innocent of any involvement. Jefferson ordered Burr's arrest, and Burr was apprehended near Natchez, Mississippi.

Wilkinson testified at Burr's trial, and the documents presented as evidence included the "cipher letter", which Wilkinson had given the prosecution. However, the letter was clearly altered to minimize Wilkinson's culpability. This forgery, coupled with Wilkinson's obviously self-serving testimony, had the effect of making Burr seem to be the victim of an overzealous government. The grand jury nearly produced enough votes in favor of indicting Wilkinson for misprision of treason, and foreman John Randolph said of Wilkinson that he was a "mammoth of iniquity", the "most finished scoundrel," and "the only man I ever saw who was from the bark to the very core a villain".

During Burr's trial, Wilkinson placed New Orleans under martial law, against the will of Governor Claiborne, and imprisoned several people who he thought might be able to connect him to Burr, along with attorneys who tried to defend them.

He was removed from the territorial governor's office after being publicly criticized for heavy-handed administration and abuse of power and was replaced with Meriwether Lewis. In addition, his actions around the Burr conspiracy became public, which aroused the public against him and led to two Congressional inquiries into his private ventures and intrigues. President James Madison, who had succeeded Jefferson in 1809, ordered a military court-martial in 1811, which exonerated Wilkinson.

=== War of 1812 ===
On March 2, 1813, Wilkinson was commissioned a major general during the War of 1812 with Britain, with whom Spain was allied. The Mobile District, now coastal Mississippi and Alabama, had remained under Spanish control following the U.S. annexation of the Republic of West Florida in 1810. On May 14, 1812, the claimed portion of West Florida east of the Pearl River was assigned to the Mississippi Territory, though at the time, the area around Mobile Bay remained under the control of Spanish Florida. Following that Congressional declaration of annexation and an act of February 12, 1813, (3 Stat. L. 472) authorizing the president to occupy that area, Wilkinson sailed from New Orleans to Mobile in April 1813 with a force of 600. There he received the surrender of the Spanish commander, effectively implementing the inclusion of the Mobile District in the Mississippi Territory.

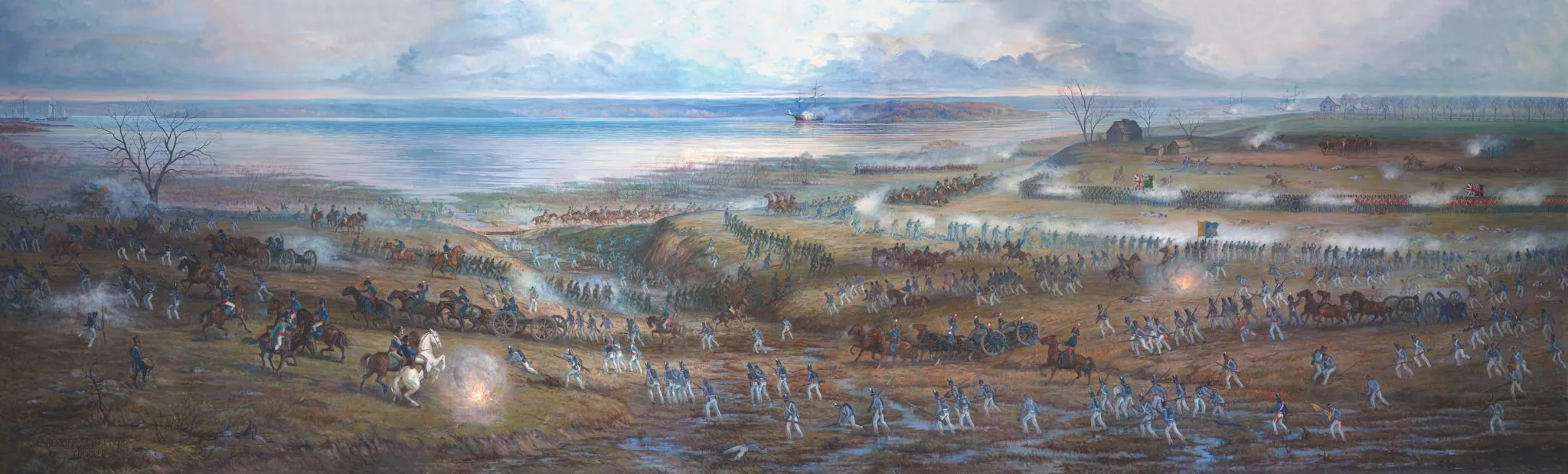
The Battle of Crysler's Farm, at which Wilkinson suffered a major defeat

He was then assigned to the St. Lawrence River theater of war, following Henry Dearborn's reassignment. Wilkinson engaged in two failed campaigns (the Battle of Crysler's Farm and the Battle of Lacolle Mills. He was relieved from active duty and court-martialed in early 1815, but he was ultimately cleared. He was discharged from the Army on June 15, 1815. In 1816, Wilkinson published Memoirs of My Own Times, in a final attempt to clear his name.

General Wilkinson may not have been a competent commander in conventional operations in the battles of Crysler's Farm and the Lacolle Mills, but he had some idea of guerilla tactics. Before the Battle of Bladensburg, General Wilkinson helped conceive a strategy of using the militia-dominated forces as guerrilla fighters against the incoming British attack on the Capitol. Wilkinson and other American commanders tried to convince the American government to use all the militia in hit-and-run tactics, ambushes, and harassment against the British forces by the flanks and rear. But President James Madison and James Monroe disapproved of the plan. Madison and Monroe wanted to fight a set-piece battle by placing the militia in linear defensive formations to fight the British head on. This led to ultimate disaster and defeat as the British easily routed the Americans at Bladensburg and burned the Capitol.

== Spanish secret agent ==
Map of the territories that would've been ceded to New Spain at the Spanish Conspiracy

In April 1787, Wilkinson made a highly controversial trip to New Orleans, which was the capital of Spanish colonial Louisiana. At that time, Americans were allowed to trade on the Mississippi River, but they had to pay a hefty tariff. Wilkinson met with Spanish Governor Esteban Rodríguez Miró and managed to convince him to allow Kentucky to have a trading monopoly on the river; in return, he promised to promote Spanish interests in the west.

On August 22, 1787, Wilkinson signed an expatriation declaration and swore allegiance to the King of Spain to satisfy his own commercial needs. The "Spanish Conspiracy", as it is known, was initiated by Wilkinson's "First Memorial", a 7,500-word report to the Spanish, written before he left New Orleans for Charleston, concerning the "political future of western settlers" and seeking to convince Spain to "admit us [Kentuckians] under protection as vassals". This was encoded with myriad symbols, numbers, and letters that were decoded via a complex English-Spanish cipher named "Number 13", which became the basis for his pseudonym, "Agent 13". Wilkinson's involvement with the Spanish (as Agent 13) was widely suspected in his own day, and it was proved in 1854, with the Louisiana historian Charles Gayarré's publication of the American general's correspondence with Esteban Rodríguez Miró, Louisiana's colonial governor between 1785 and 1791.

== Last years ==
After the end of his military career, Wilkinson was appointed U.S. Envoy to Mexico. This was during the period of the Mexican War of Independence against Spain, which was won in 1821. In that year, Wilkinson requested a Texas land grant. While awaiting the Mexican government's approval of his land scheme, and attempting to be appointed the first U.S. Minister to Mexico, Wilkinson died in Mexico City on December 28, 1825, at the age of 68. He was buried in Mexico City.

== Later view ==
Some 65 years after the general's misdeeds, the then-governor of New York, Theodore Roosevelt, condemned him in print: "In all our history, there is no more despicable character." The historian Robert Leckie characterized him as "a general who never won a battle or lost a court-martial", and Frederick Jackson Turner called Wilkinson "the most consummate artist in treason that the nation ever possessed". George Rogers Clark's biographer Temple Bodley said of Wilkinson, "He had considerable military talent, but used it only for his own gain." It has been speculated but never proven that Wilkinson had Anthony Wayne assassinated by poison. Wilkinson is documented secretly undermining him throughout his later career, benefited from his death, and would replace him as commander after his death.

== Legacy ==
- Frankfort, Kentucky's downtown was created from land owned by Wilkinson, and he designed the layout. A major street, which runs along historic Liberty Hall, was named Wilkinson Street.
- New Orleans has a short street called Wilkinson, named for James Wilkinson, in the French Quarter near Jackson Square. There is also a Wilkinson Street in Mandeville, Louisiana. Many of the oldest streets in Mandeville, close to Lake Pontchartrain, are named after prominent New Orleans residents of the late 18th and early 19th centuries or for Battle of New Orleans heroes.
- Wilkinson County, Georgia, is named for Wilkinson. A Georgia historical marker on the courthouse square gives a brief biography of the general and identifies him as the source of the county's name. (The entry on the county in the usually reliable reference Georgia Place Names, by the late Kenneth Krakow, confuses James Wilkinson with James Marion Wilkinson, a Valdosta politician and railroad executive who was born decades after the county was founded.)
- Wilkinson County, Mississippi, is named for General Wilkinson as well. It was there in the Old Natchez District that Wilkinson spent much of his time, allegedly plotting the Burr Conspiracy; Fort Adams (then an important U.S. Army post) was constructed by Wilkinson as the most southwesterly point in the U.S. and the last American stop on the Mississippi River before entering Spanish territory.
- Wilkinson was an avid supporter of the military's short-hair codes. He attempted to prosecute Colonel Thomas Butler, a veteran of both the Revolution and the Indian wars, for keeping his long hair. Colonel Butler died before the trials closed. He never did cut his long, braided queue prior to his death and a possibly apocryphal story tells that his last request was for a hole to be drilled in his casket so that the queue could hang out and taunt Wilkinson even in death.
- Wilkinson was elected to the American Philosophical Society in 1789.
- Washington Irving parodied Wilkinson as General Von Poffenburgh in his 1809 A History of New-York.

== See also ==
- Jane Herbert Wilkinson Long – Wilkinson's niece, nicknamed "Mother of Texas"
- Philip Nolan – Wilkinson's protege

Military offices
| Preceded by Anthony Wayne | Senior Officer of the United States Army; 1796–1798 | Succeeded by George Washington |
| Preceded by Alexander Hamilton | Senior Officer of the United States Army; 1800–1812 | Succeeded by Henry Dearborn |
Political offices
| Preceded by William Henry Harrison (District of Louisiana) | Governor of Louisiana Territory; 1805–1807 | Succeeded by Meriwether Lewis |
