= Carondelet Farm =

Horse breeding farm in San Diego, California

Coordinates: 32°43′30″N 117°13′26″W

Carondelet Farm is a horse racing operation and breeding farm in Ramona, California near San Diego. The property was named after Carondelet Street in New Orleans.

Carondelet Farm has raced and/or bred a number of Graded and Group Stakes Winners including Champion racehorse Artax who won the 1999 Breeders' Cup Sprint.

== History ==
David Bernsen established Carondelet Farm in the early 1990s in Ramona, California near San Diego after purchasing the property from actor Jimmy Cagney.

A complete renovation of Carondelet Farm was conducted while maintaining the look and feel from the 1950s from when the Cagney family used the property as their base while they attended horse races at the Del Mar Fairgrounds.

The property became home to Raging Apalachee, the dam of the American Champion Sprinter Artax.
