= Juan Manuel de Salcedo =

Last Governor of Spanish Louisiana

11th Governor of Spanish Louisiana
- In office 1801–1803
- Monarch: Charles IV
- Preceded by: Sebastián Calvo de la Puerta y O'Farrill
- Succeeded by: Pierre Clément de Laussat as Colonial Prefect of Louisiana

Personal details
- Born: 1743 Bilbao, Spain
- Died: c. 1810 Seville, Spain
- Spouse: Francisca de Quiroga y Manso (m. 1775; died 1801)

Military service
- Allegiance: Viceroyalty of New Spain; Kingdom of Spain
- Branch/service: Spanish Army
- Rank: Lieutenant
- Battles/wars: Seven Years' War; Battle of Santa Cruz de Tenerife

Juan Manuel de Salcedo was the 11th and final governor of Spanish Louisiana, from 1801–1803. He was governor at the time of the cession of the Louisiana territory to France in fulfillment of the terms of the Treaty of San Ildefonso.

== Early career ==
A native of Bilbao, Salcedo pursued a military career and served as an officer in the defense of the Lordship of Biscay in the Seven Years' War. By the late 1760s, he was serving in North Africa with postings in Spanish ports of Ceuta and Melilla, before being transferred to the Canary Islands. In 1776, the arrived in Santa Cruz de Tenerife, where he was to remain for twenty years, rising to the position of teniente del rey (lieutenant to the king). In July 1797, Salcedo participated in the successful defense of Santa Cruz de Tenerife, capturing 29 British soldiers.

== Governor of Spanish Louisiana ==
Salcedo was appointed governor of Louisiana on October 24, 1799, to replace Governor Gayoso, who had died in office, but due to ill health he did not actually assume the position until July 15, 1801. During the interim, Sebastián Calvo de la Puerta y O'Farrill served as governor in his stead. His governorship was not well-regarded; he reportedly humiliated the members of the Cabildo and boycotted its meetings. He was quite hostile to the United States; one of his first official acts was to dispatch arms to Natchitoches, along with instructions to keep Americans out of the district, and he forbade the granting of land to American citizens.

Salcedo's tenure as governor ended with the return of Louisiana to France, shortly before the Sale of Louisiana. His predecessor, Casa Calvo, assisted him in the transfer of power to the new French governor, Pierre Clément de Laussat on November 30, 1803. Departing New Orleans in May 1804, Salcedo returned to Cadiz, Spain. Although Salcedo initial intended to retire to the Canary Islands, he sought and received permission to stay in Spain to be closer to his youngest son and his family and by early 1805 Salcedo was assigned to Andalusia, settling in Seville.

== Family ==
Salcedo married Francisca de Quiroga y Manso in Málaga in 1775. Their son, Manuel María de Salcedo, later served as governor of Spanish Texas. His brother, Nemesio de Salcedo, was the Commandant General of the Interior Provinces.

Preceded by Sebastián Calvo de la Puerta y O'Farrill	Spanish Governor of Louisiana; 1801–1803	Succeeded by Pierre Clément de Laussat as French Governor of Louisiana
