= Esteban Rodríguez Miró =

Spanish army officer

The Most Excellent Field Marshal Esteban Rodríguez Miró KOS
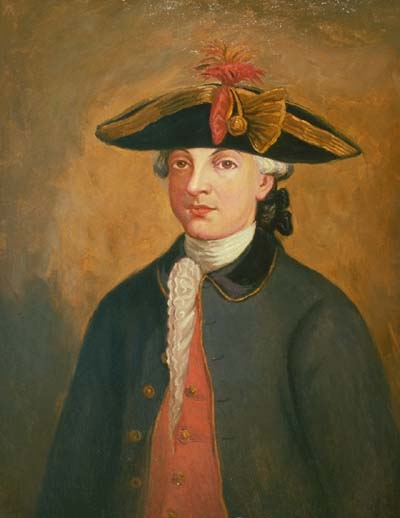
- Posthumous Portrait (1916) by Andres Molinary

6th Spanish Governor of Louisiana Governor and Captain General of West Florida
- In office 14 July 1785 – 30 November 1791
- Monarchs: Charles III; Charles IV
- First Secretary of State: Count of Floridablanca
- Secretary of State for the Indies: José de Gálvez; Count of Floridablanca (as interim)
- Viceroy of New Spain: Bernardo de Gálvez; Eusebio Sánchez Pareja (as Regent of the Audiencia); Alonso Núñez de Haro y Peralta; Manuel Antonio Flórez; Juan Vicente de Güemes
- Captain General of Cuba: Bernardo de Troncoso y Martínez del Rincón (as interim); José de Ezpeleta y Galdeano; Domingo Cabello y Robles; Luis de las Casas
- Preceded by: Bernardo de Gálvez
- Succeeded by: Francisco Luis Héctor de Carondelet

Personal details
- Born: Esteban Rodríguez Miró y Sabater; 1744 Reus, Catalonia, Spain
- Died: June 4, 1795 (aged 50–51) Vergara, Spain
- Spouse: Marie Céleste Eléonore de Macarty

Military service
- Allegiance: Viceroyalty of New Spain; Spain
- Branch/service: (Spain) Spanish Army
- Years of service: 1760–1795
- Rank: Field Marshal
- Battles/wars: Seven Years' War; American Revolutionary War; War of the Pyrenees

Esteban Rodríguez Miró y Sabater KOS (1744 – June 4, 1795), also known as Esteban Miro and Estevan Miro, was a Spanish army officer and governor of the Spanish provinces of Louisiana and Florida. He was one of the most popular of the Spanish governors, largely because of his prompt response to the New Orleans Fire of 1788, which destroyed almost all of the city.

== Early life ==
Esteban Miró was born in Reus (currently in the province of Tarragona, Catalonia), Spain, to Francisco Miró and Marian de Miró y Sabater. He joined the military in 1760 during the Seven Years' War. Around 1765, he was transferred to Mexico and rose to the rank of lieutenant. He returned to Spain in the 1770s and received military training before being sent to Louisiana in 1778.

== Governor of Louisiana ==
In 1779, during the American Revolutionary War and Anglo-Spanish War (1779–1783), Miró was a part of the forces commanded by Bernardo de Gálvez in campaigns against the British in West Florida. Gálvez appointed Miró as acting Governor of Louisiana (New Spain) on January 20, 1782. He became proprietary governor on December 16, 1785. Spain had taken over this territory from France after the latter's defeat in 1763 by Great Britain in the Seven Years' War.

After the Revolutionary War, Miró was a key figure in Spain's boundary dispute with the United States (US) over the northern boundary of West Florida. Under Spanish rule, the boundary had been 31° north latitude. In 1763, it came under British control at the end of the Seven Years' War. In 1767, the northern boundary was moved to 32°28' north latitude (from the current location of Vicksburg, Mississippi, east to the Chattahoochee River).

In 1783, Britain recognized the Spanish conquest of West Florida in the war, but it did not specify the northern border. In the separate treaty with the US, Britain specified the southern boundary as 31 degrees north latitude. Spain claimed the British expansion of West Florida, while the US held to the older boundary. Britain had also granted free navigation on the Pearl River to the US, even in areas where Spain claimed both sides of the river.

In 1784, the Spanish government closed the lower Mississippi River to the Americans, causing significant fear and resentment among settlers in the western frontiers of Kentucky and Tennessee, who depended on river trade and the major port of New Orleans. In 1790, Miró fortified Nogales (present-day Vicksburg) and the mouth of the Mississippi against the possibility of war with the US.

The settlers' anger was directed as much toward the US government for not acting aggressively enough to protect their interests as it was against Spain. A significant faction within Kentucky considered becoming an independent republic rather than joining the US. One of the leaders of this faction was James Wilkinson, who met with Miró in 1787, declared his allegiance to Spain, and secretly acted as an agent for Spain. Wilkinson's schemes to set up an independent nation friendly to Spain in the west did little except cause controversy. This resurfaced later in another form through Wilkinson's dealings with Aaron Burr.

Map of the US territories that would have been ceded to New Spain as a result of the Spanish conspiracy.

After the Good Friday fire in March of 1788 destroyed almost all of the city of New Orleans, Miró arranged for tents for residents, brought in food from warehouses, sent ships to Philadelphia for aid, and lifted Spanish regulations restricting trade to the city. The city of New Orleans (today's French Quarter), was rebuilt with more fire-resistant buildings of brick, plaster, heavy masonry, ceramic tiled roofs, and courtyards. Among the new buildings built under his watch was the Saint Louis Cathedral.

In 1786, Miró enacted the tignon law, which required Creole of color, Black, and Indigenous women to wear a scarf or other head covering. Although intended to limit these women and to restrict their fashion choices, the policy lead to a tradition of wearing elaborate tignons.

== Return to Spain ==
Miró surrendered governorship at the end of 1791 to return to Spain and serve in the Ministry of War. He served as Field Marshal from 1793–1795 in the war with the French Republic. He died from natural causes during the War of the Pyrenees at the battlefront in June 1795.

== Legacy ==
In 1788, North Carolina formed a judicial district called the Mero District in its westernmost territory (the area presently around Nashville, Tennessee); it was named after Miró but misspelled by the legislature.

Among Louisianians, Miró is chiefly remembered for having prevented the establishment of the Inquisition in the territory. Charles Gayarré wrote the following account:

"The reverend Capuchin, Antonio de Sedella, who had lately arrived in the province, wrote to the Governor to inform him that he, the holy father, had been appointed Commissary of the Inquisition; that in a letter of the 5th of December last, from the proper authority, this intelligence had been communicated to him, and that he had been requested to discharge his functions with the most exact fidelity and zeal, and in conformity with the royal will. Wherefore, after having made his investigations with the utmost secrecy and precaution, he notified Mirò that, in order to carry, as he was commanded, his instructions into perfect execution in all their parts, he might soon, at some late hour of the night, deem it necessary to require some guards to assist him in his operations.

Not many hours had elapsed since the reception of this communication by the Governor, when night came, and the representative of the Holy Inquisition was quietly reposing in bed, when he was roused from his sleep by a heavy knocking. He started up, and, opening his door, saw standing before him an officer and a file of grenadiers. Thinking that they had come to obey his commands, in consequence of his letter to the Governor, he said: 'My friends, I thank you and his Excellency for the readiness of this compliance with my request. But I have now no use for your services, and you shall be warned in time when you are wanted. Retire then, with the blessing of God.' Great was the stupefaction of the Friar when he was told that he was under arrest. 'What!' exclaimed he, 'will you dare lay your hands on a Commissary of the Holy Inquisition?' — 'I dare obey orders,' replied the undaunted officer, and the Reverend Father Antonio de Sedella was instantly carried on board of a vessel, which sailed the next day for Cádiz."

This was an instance of the conflict within the central government at Madrid and also between it and the colonial governors: Miró's policy, approved by the Crown, had been to strengthen Louisiana against the US and other powers by encouraging settlement; this included requiring public practice of Catholicism, but ignoring private worship. The royal ministers had ordered an expansion of the Inquisition in response to the French Revolution.

== Personal life ==
Miro married Marie Céleste Eléonore de Macarty, cousin to his contemporary, New Orleans Mayor Augustin de Macarty. A niece by marriage was Delphine LaLaurie, who was 8 years old at his death and later became a serial killer.

== Legacy and honors ==
- Miro Street in New Orleans is named in his honor. Once running from the Lower 9th Ward at St. Bernard Parish ("downtown"), to Claiborne Ave. in the Fontainebleau neighborhood ("Uptown"), the street has been broken into several segments by subsequent developments, such as the Industrial Canal.
- General James Wilkinson named the present Mero (sic) Street in Frankfort, Kentucky, for Governor Miró.
- At inception in 1796, half of the newly created State of Tennessee was named for Miró: the Mero District. The name remained in use until at least 1807.

== Notes ==
Preceded by Bernardo de Gálvez	Spanish Governor of Louisiana; 1785–1791	Succeeded by Francisco Luis Héctor de Carondelet
