= Spanish West Florida =

1783–1821 province of the Spanish Empire

Province of West Florida
- Province of Viceroyalty of New Spain
- 1783–1821
- Left: Cross of Burgundy; Right: Early modern flag

- Capital: Pensacola
- Government
  - Type: Colonial government
- Governor
  - 1783–1792: Arturo O'Neill de Tyrone
  - 1819–1821: José María Callava
- History
  - Peace of Paris (1783): 10 February 1783
  - Disestablished: 1821
Preceded by
British West Florida
Succeeded by
Republic of West Florida
Territory of Orleans
Territory of Mississippi
Territory of Florida

Spanish West Florida (Spanish: Florida Occidental) was a province of the Spanish Empire from 1783 until 1821, when both it and East Florida were ceded to the United States.

The region of West Florida initially had the same borders as the erstwhile British colony. Much of its territory was gradually annexed by the United States in the West Florida Controversy. At its greatest extent, the colony included what are now the Florida Parishes of Louisiana, the southernmost parts of Mississippi and Alabama, and the Panhandle of Florida. Whereas Southeastern Louisiana and present-day coastal Mississippi and Alabama were annexed either before or during the War of 1812, the land that makes up present-day Florida was not acquired until several years later. It became the Florida Territory of the United States in 1822.

== History ==
Spain was the first European state to colonize the Florida peninsula, expanding northward from Cuba and establishing long-lasting settlements at St. Augustine, on the Atlantic coast, as well as at Pensacola and San Marcos (St. Marks), on the Gulf of Mexico coast.

Following Spain's losses to Great Britain during the Seven Years' War, Spain ceded its Florida territory to Britain in 1763. British administrators then divided the territory into two colonies: East Florida, including the Florida peninsula with the capital at St. Augustine, and West Florida, to which was appended part of the territory received from France under the 1763 peace treaty. West Florida extended from the Apalachicola River to the Mississippi River, with its capital at Pensacola.

In 1779, Spain entered the American Revolutionary War on the side of France but not the Thirteen Colonies. Bernardo de Gálvez, governor of Spanish Louisiana, led a military campaign along the Gulf coast, capturing Baton Rouge and Natchez from the British in 1779, Mobile in 1780, and Pensacola in 1781.

In the 1783 Paris peace treaty, Great Britain returned both Florida colonies to Spanish control. Instead of administering Florida as a single province, as it had before 1763, New Spain preserved the British arrangement of dividing the territory between East and West Florida (Florida Oriental and Florida Occidental). When Spain acquired West Florida in 1783, the eastern British boundary was the Apalachicola River, but Spain moved it eastward to the Suwannee River in 1785. The purpose was to transfer San Marcos and the district of Apalachee from East Florida to West Florida.

=== Population and demographics ===
When British West Florida surrendered to the Spanish, civilian residents of Pensacola were given the option of staying or leaving, with most opting to leave. Pensacola primarily functioned as a British military garrison and most of its inhabitants were directly or indirectly involved with the garrison. At the time of the transfer of West Florida to the Spanish from the British the population of Pensacola excluding its military garrison was about 300. The population of Pensacola would grow, with the civilian population in 1788 being 265 and increasing to 572 by 1791. However, when Spain went to war in April of 1793 some residents left, reducing the population to 400. With the loss of Spanish Louisiana, the population grew further to 1,000 by 1810 and peaked in a census taken on June 13, 1813 at 3,063 people.

Between where Pensacola ended and the American settlements began, control of the land was left to several Native American tribes: the Cherokee, the Chickasaw, the Choctaw and the Creek, which altogether had a population of 45,000.

With the arrival of the Spanish in West Florida, they did not revive the mission system they had left behind when the British gained control of Florida in 1763. The Spanish adopted a policy that allowed for religious freedom among those who lived there, but did not permit them to practice any faith other than Roman Catholicism in public.

The Spanish aided the migration of the French Acadians to the colony's Louisiana bayous by subsidizing their "transportation, maintenance, and financial aid" between 1783 and 1785 and their migration to Louisiana resulted in the Cajun culture forming.

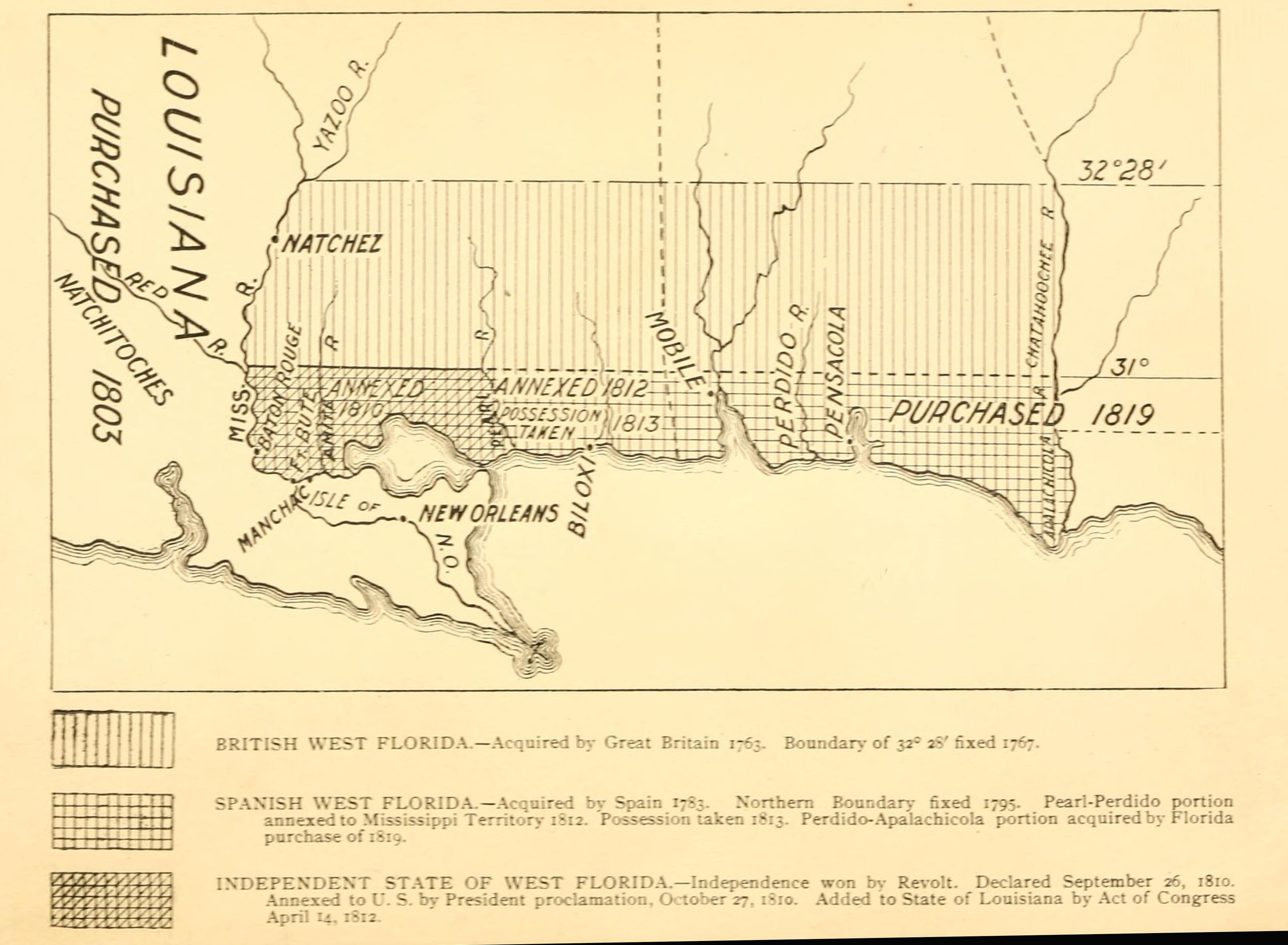
Map showing piecemeal reduction of Spanish control in West Florida^{p 2}

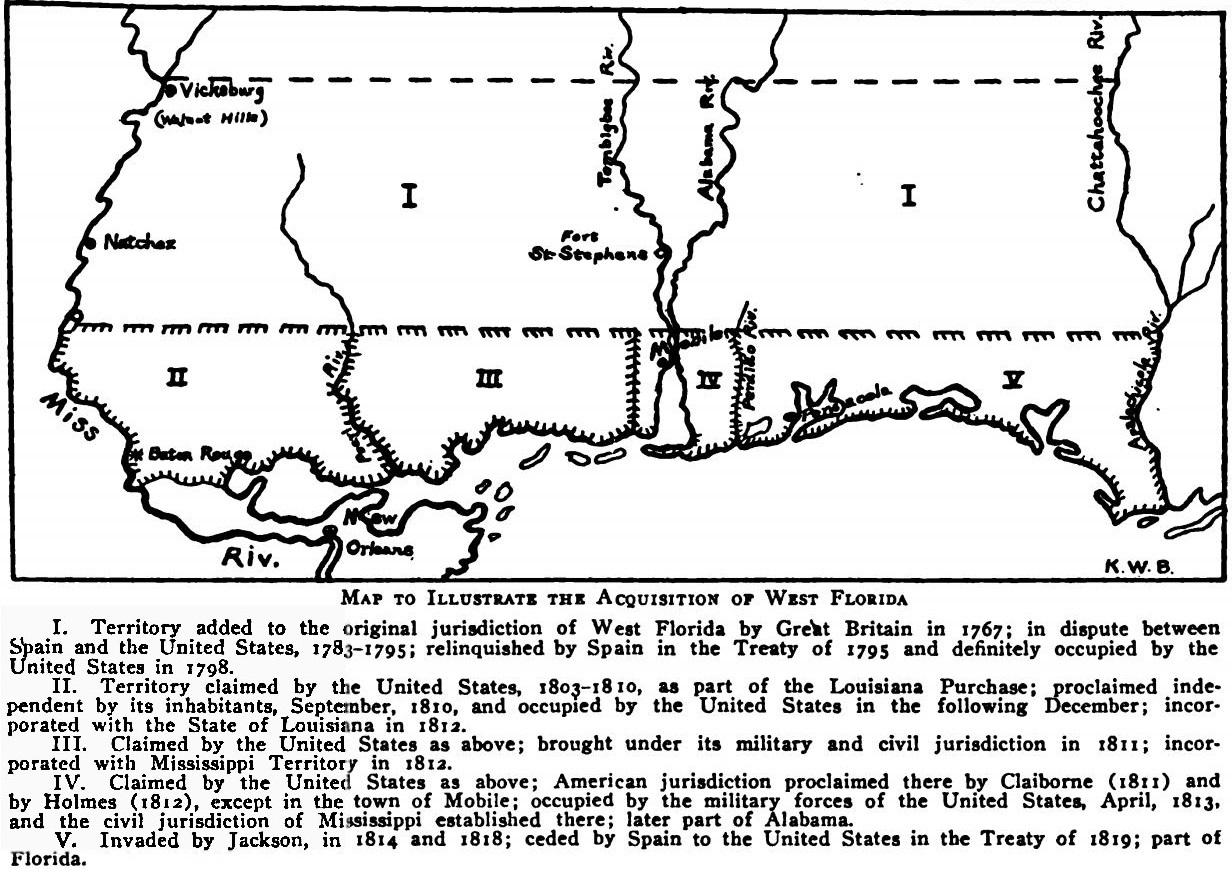
Annotated map of the territorial changes of Spanish West Florida

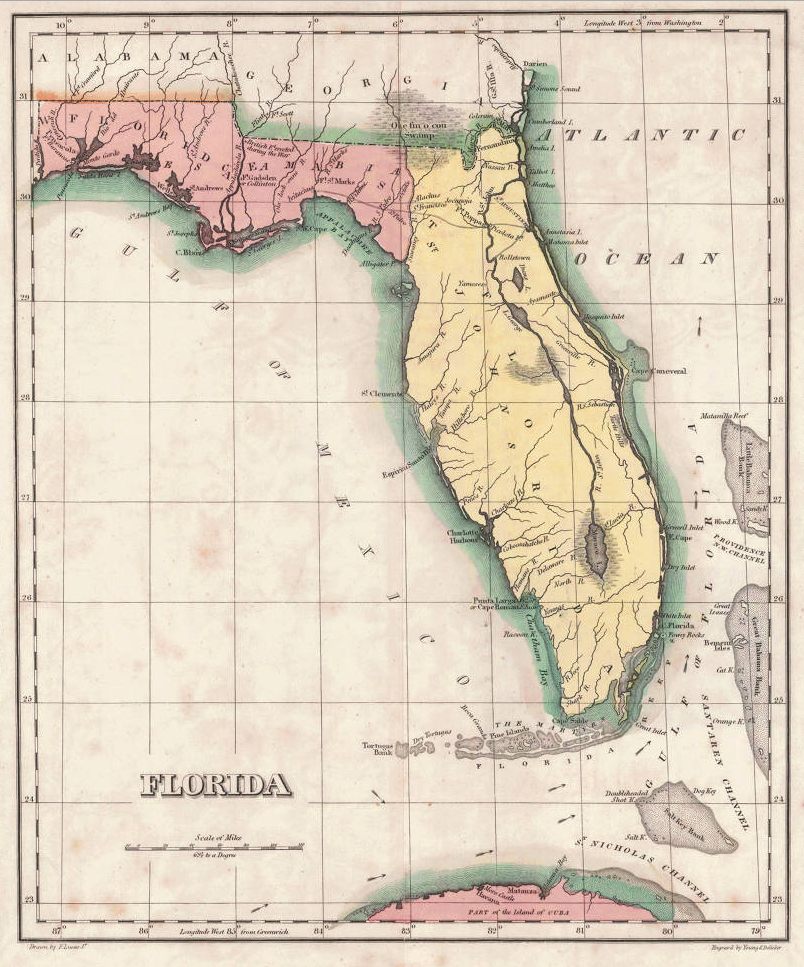
Under Spanish rule, Florida was divided by the natural separation of the Suwannee River into West Florida and East Florida (map: Carey & Lea, 1822).

== See also ==
- Spanish Florida
- Republic of West Florida

== Bibliography ==
- Arthur, Stanley Clisby (1935). The Story of the West Florida Rebellion. St. Francisville Democrat. ISBN 1-885480-47-4. OCLC 1354769. Reprint, Pioneer Publishing, 164 pp.
- Cox, Isaac Joslin (1918). The West Florida Controversy, 1798–1813: A Study in American Diplomacy. Baltimore, Md: The Johns Hopkins Press. OCLC 479174.
- Gannon, Michael (1996). The New History of Florida. University Press of Florida. ISBN 0-8130-1415-8.
- McMichael, Andrew (2008). Atlantic Loyalties: Americans in Spanish West Florida, 1785–1810. University of George Press. ISBN 978-0-8203-3004-4.
- West Florida Collection, Center for Southeast Louisiana Studies, Linus A. Sims Memorial Library, Southeastern Louisiana University, Hammond. For a summary of the holdings see West Florida Archival Collection
