= Battle of Lake Pontchartrain =

1779 naval battle of the American Revolution

- Part of the Gulf Coast campaign
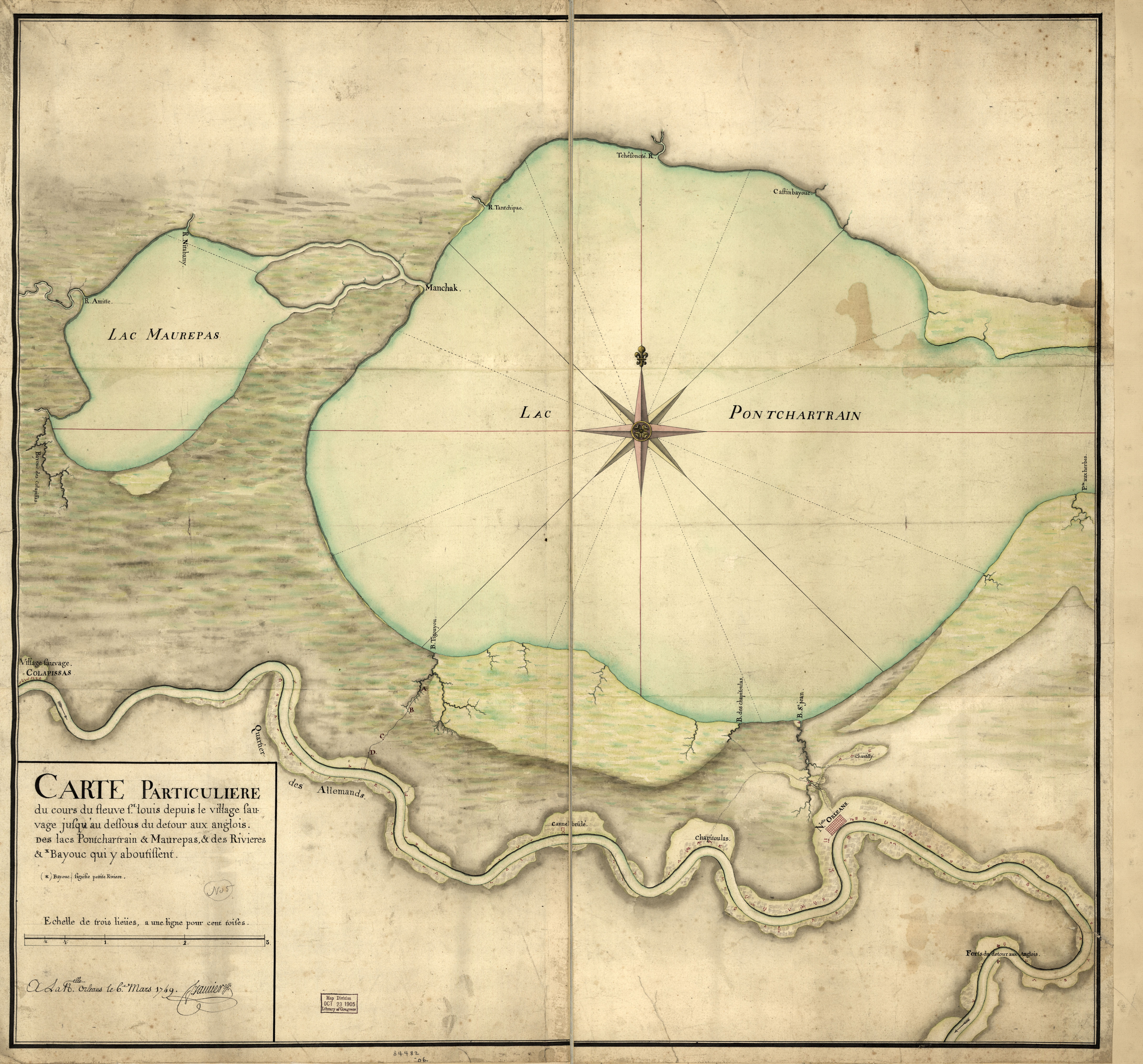
- 1749 map of Lake Pontchartrain
Date	10 September 1779
Location	Lake Pontchartrain, then British West Florida, now Louisiana 30°11′20″N 90°06′05″W
Result	American-Spanish victory

Belligerents
United States; Spain	Great Britain

Commanders and leaders
William Pickles	John Payne (WIA)

Strength
57 men 1 schooner (USS Morris)	15 men 1 sloop (HMS West Florida)

Casualties and losses
6–8 killed some wounded	2 killed 1 wounded 1 sloop captured

The Battle of Lake Pontchartrain was a single-ship action on September 10, 1779, part of the Anglo-Spanish War. It was fought between the British sloop-of-war HMS West Florida and the Continental Navy schooner USS Morris in the waters of Lake Pontchartrain, then in the British province of West Florida.

West Florida was patrolling on Lake Pontchartrain when it encountered Morris, which had set out from New Orleans with a Spanish and American crew headed by Continental Navy Captain William Pickles. The larger crew of Morris successfully boarded West Florida, inflicting a mortal wound on its captain, Lieutenant John Payne. The capture of West Florida all but eliminated the British naval presence on the lake, weakening already tenuous British control over the western reaches of West Florida.

== Background ==
Significant military activities of the American Revolutionary War did not occur on the Gulf Coast until 1779, when Spain entered the war. Before then, New Orleans, then the capital of Spanish Louisiana, served as a semi-secret source of money and materiel for the Patriot cause. The cause was quietly supported by the Spanish governors before 1779, and often mediated by Oliver Pollock, a prominent New Orleans businessman. Pollock effectively acted as an agent of the Continental Congress, negotiating with the Spanish governor, and taking other actions, including spending some of his own fortune, on Patriot activities along the lower Mississippi River.

In 1778 James Willing led a raiding expedition directed against targets in British West Florida. One prize that he captured on the Mississippi River was a British ship, Rebecca, which he brought into New Orleans. She was brought into the Continental Navy and rechristened USS Morris in honor of Philadelphia financier Robert Morris.

The British province of West Florida extended from the Mississippi River in the west to the Apalachicola River in the east. HMS West Florida had been cruising Lake Pontchartrain since 1776 under the command of George Burdon, stopping and searching all manner of shipping, including Spanish merchants destined for New Orleans, to the annoyance of the Spanish. Burdon was unsuccessful in tracking down Willing during his 1778 raid, and returned to Pensacola, West Florida's capital, for refit and repair late in 1778. In January 1779 Burdon was replaced at her helm by Lieutenant John Payne, who had been engaged in survey duty along the West Florida coast and knew the area well. West Florida was a sloop-of-war armed, according to its captors, with several four- and six-pound cannon and carrying a crew complement of about 30. (British accounts place the crew size at 15.)

== Prelude ==
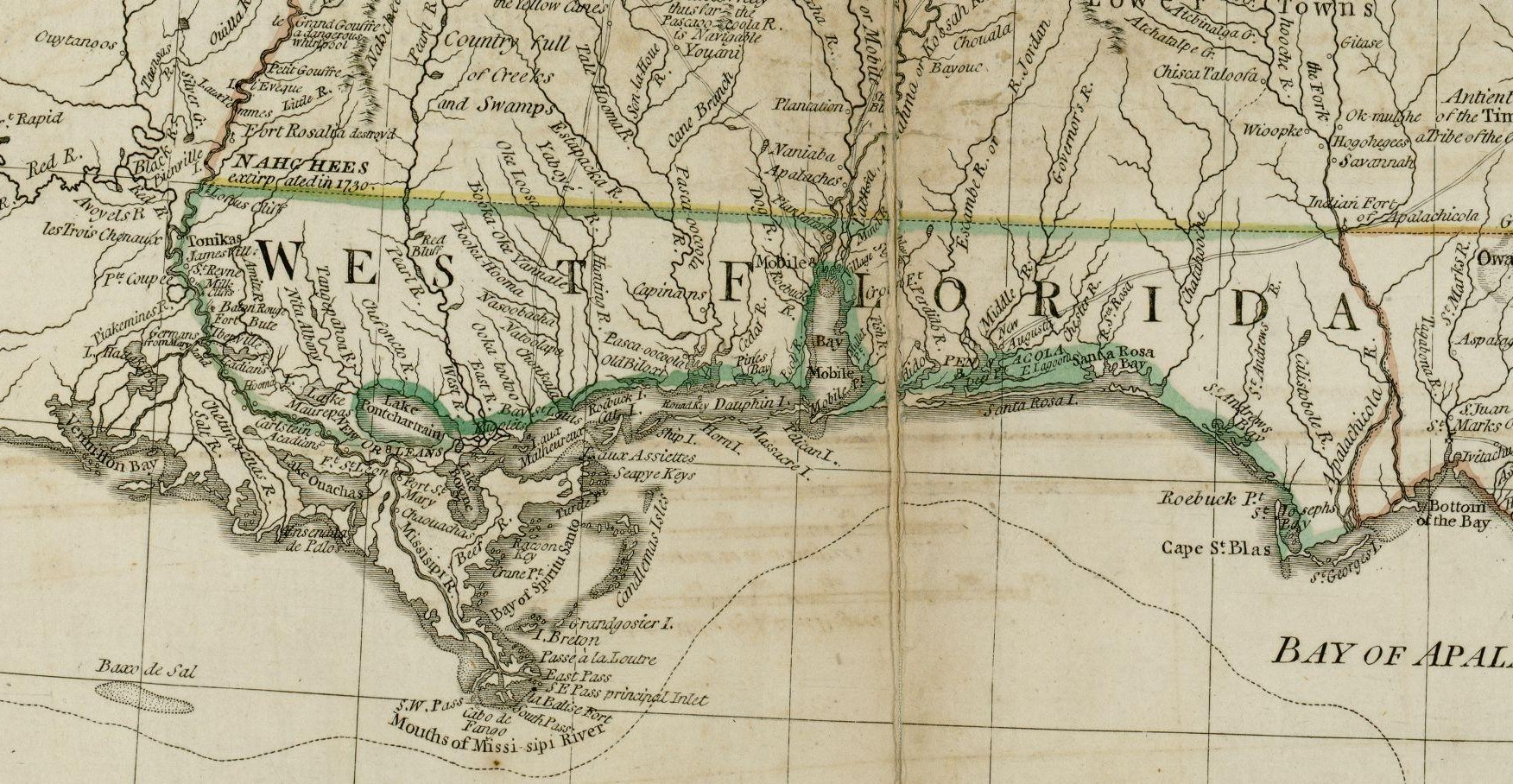
Detail from a 1776 map showing the British province of West Florida

Payne cruised West Florida's waters uneventfully until August 1779. On August 27 he sent a boat with a few men to make contact with a detachment of Lieutenant Colonel Alexander Dickson's men at Manchac. The boat never returned. On that day Bernardo de Gálvez, the governor of Spanish Louisiana, launched an expedition to gain control of British military posts on the Mississippi, and the boat was captured by his men. Gálvez successfully took the Manchac garrison on September 7, and negotiated the surrender of Dickson and the remaining British forces on the Mississippi after the Battle of Baton Rouge on September 21. Payne was unaware of these activities, however.

Pollock used commissioning authority granted him by Congress to give command of Morris to Continental Navy Captain William Pickles. However, she was destroyed in a hurricane (which also delayed the departure of Gálvez' expedition), and Gálvez provided another ship for Pickles' use, variously called Morris or "Morris's tender". According to the report of Lieutenant Peter George Rousseau, Pickles' second-in-command, this ship was a schooner armed with five small (2.5 pound or less) cannon and ten swivel guns, and that it lacked barricades to protect the men on deck from gunfire. Furthermore, the crew was not otherwise well prepared for close action, lacking axes, lances, and other tools useful for a boarding action. Pollock instructed Pickles to harass British military shipping on the lake, which had recently increased in activity.

== Battle ==
Pickles sailed from New Orleans with a crew of 57 Americans and Spaniards (Rousseau, his second in command, was a Frenchman commissioned into the Continental Navy). To hide his intentions, Pickles flew a British ensign as a false flag. Spotted on September 10, the two ships closed, and Payne hailed Morris to discover her intentions. He was told she was a merchant bound for Pensacola shortly before Pickles had the false colors hauled down and replaced with an American flag. The Americans and Spaniards then threw grappling hooks to bring the ships together and opened fire with their swivel guns while Lieutenant Rousseau prepared a boarding party. It is unlikely that either ship fired its larger guns.

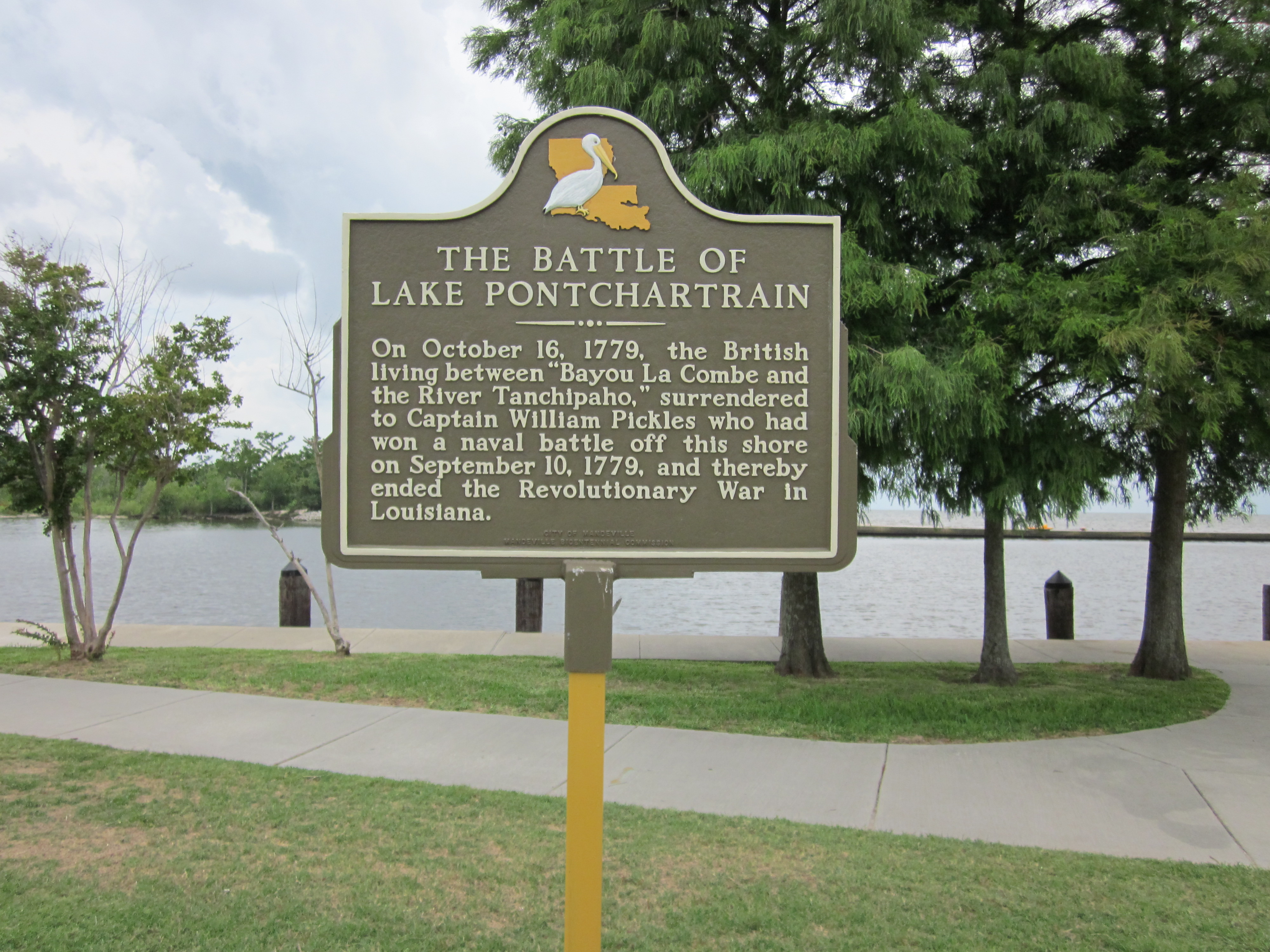
Historic marker in Mandeville, Louisiana

Payne's small crew put up spirited resistance, twice repulsing the boarders. The third boarding attempt succeeded, and Payne himself went down with a mortal wound in fighting described as "very violent". The boarders successfully overwhelmed the British, wounding two men in addition to Payne, while suffering six to eight killed and several wounded.

== Aftermath ==
Captain Pickles took the prize back to New Orleans, where Pollock had her fitted out. Pickles cruised with her in West Florida's waters during Governor Gálvez's march up the Mississippi. Pickles then assisted Gálvez in the Battle of Fort Charlotte, which resulted in the capture of Mobile, before sailing her to Philadelphia for sale.

The battle is commemorated by a historic marker in Mandeville, Louisiana. The marker credits William Pickles with ending the Revolutionary War in Louisiana, since some British individuals on the north shore of Lake Pontchartrain evidently surrendered to Captain Pickles in mid-October 1779 (three weeks after the Battle of Baton Rouge). In this context, "Louisiana" means the future state of Louisiana and not the larger area of Spanish Louisiana. The Battle of St. Louis, also within Spanish Louisiana, took place in 1780.
