= Carlos de Grand Pré =

Spanish colonial governor (1745–1809)

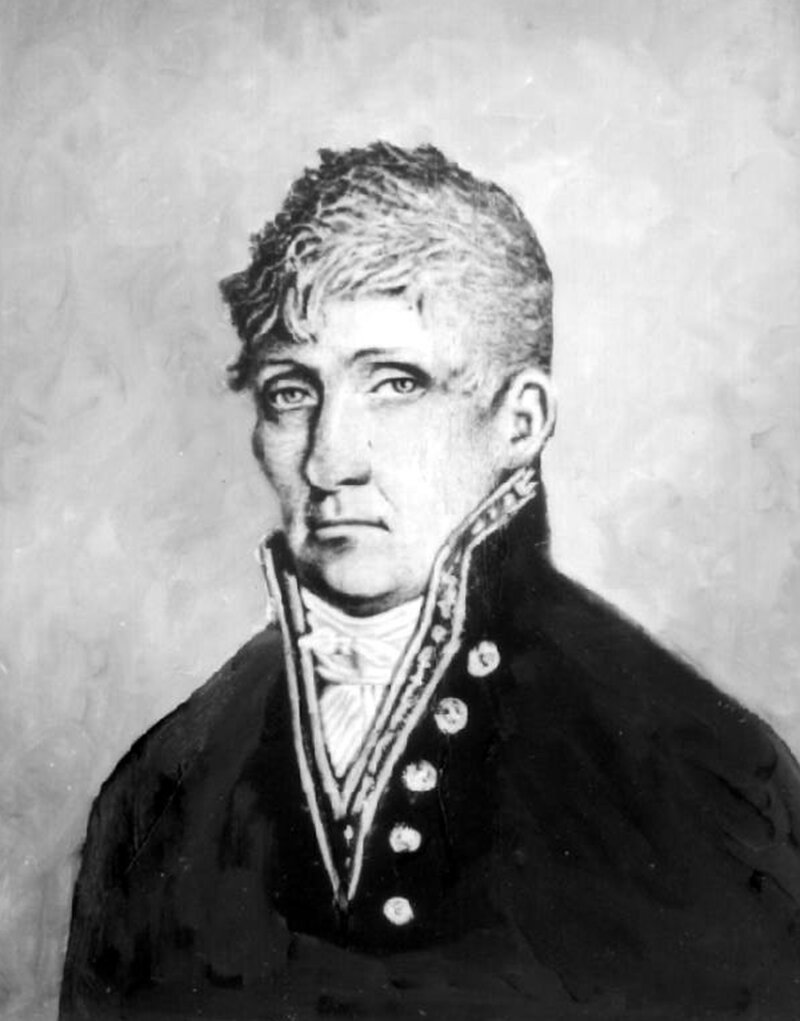

Governor Baton Rouge District, West Florida
- In office 1799–1808
- Monarchs: Charles IV; Ferdinand VII
- Preceded by: Peter Chester as governor of British West Florida
- Succeeded by: Carlos de Hault de Lassus

Personal details
- Born: 1746 New Orleans, Louisiana
- Died: 1809 (aged 62–63) Havana, Cuba
- Profession: Administrator and Military personnel

Carlos Louis Boucher de Grand Pré (Note: His surname is sometimes written with the de prefix attached to the following element in his name with varying capitalization, spacing, and punctuation, i.e., de GrandPre, deGrand-Pré or Degrandpre.) (October 25, 1745 – 1809) was Spanish governor of the Baton Rouge district (1799–1808), as well as brevet colonel in the Spanish Army. He also served as lieutenant governor of Red River District and of the Natchez District.

== Biography ==
Grand Pré was born in New Orleans, and was baptized Charles Louis Grand Pré on 25 October 1745, at the parish church of St. Louis in New Orleans. His parents were the Canadian nobleman Louis Antoine Boucher de Grand Pré, a captain of the Compagnies Franches de la Marine and commandant of the Arkansas Post and Fort Tombecbe, and his Louisiana creole wife Thérèse Gallard. In Spanish records after 1769, his first name is usually given as "Carlos."

=== Military career ===
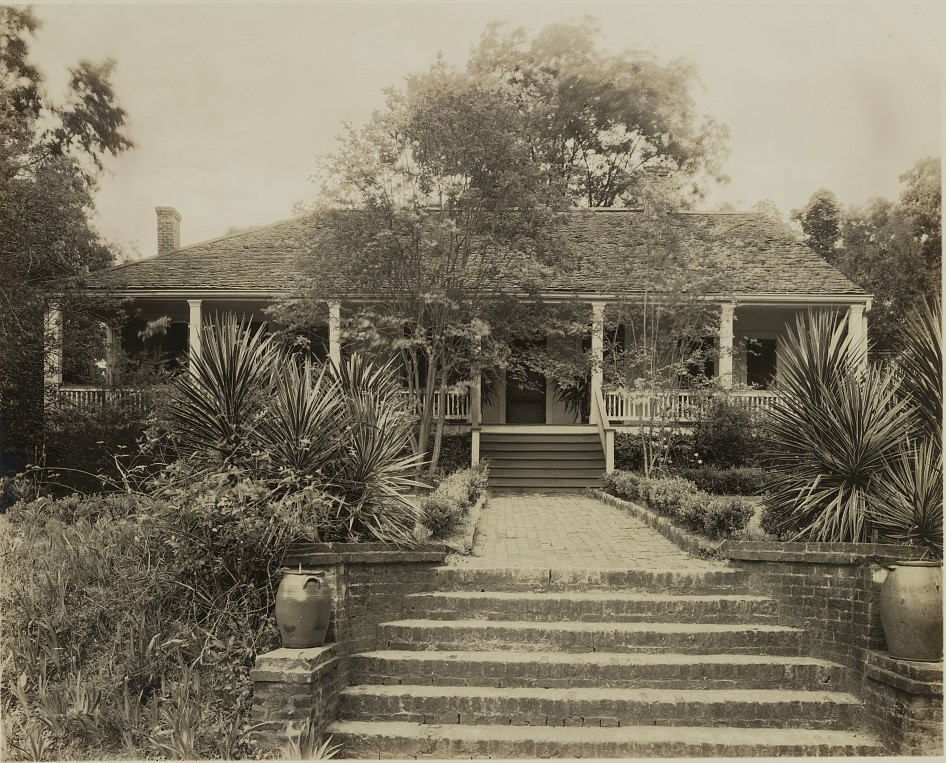
Farm built in Natchez for Carlos de Grand Pré around 1789 (photo published in 1938).

Grand Pré entered Spanish military service in New Orleans during the brief administration of Antonio de Ulloa. In February 1770, Governor Alejandro O'Reilly appointed him first adjunct major of the Louisiana militia. He continued in Spanish service in Louisiana for the rest of his career. During the American Revolutionary War, he served under the command of Governor Bernardo de Gálvez. Grand Pré was positioned at Point Coupée in 1779 and in the lead up to Spain's taking of Fort Manchac and Fort New Richmond, he crossed the Mississippi to capture British posts on Thompson Creek and the Amite River, severing lines of communication between Baton Rouge and Natchez. When a loyalist militia ousted the Spanish garrison at Fort Panmure in April 1781, Grand Pré organized its recapture a month later.

Grand Pré served as commandant of Natchez District between 1786 and 1792. During this period, Grand Pré built two parishes here in an attempt to convert inhabitants to Catholicism; however, the venture was unsuccessful. In 1789, he established the "Concord" mansion, the residence for Spanish governors in the district, in Natchez. In a letter dated March 2, 1790, Carlos de Grand Pré created a list of tobacco farmers in the Natchez District, mainly from Kentucky and Virginia, that outlined production quantities and origination of each farm between the years of 1788 and 1790.

He remained in Natchez until after the signing of Pinckney's Treaty in 1795, which established borders between the United States and Spain. To offset the loss of Natchez in the treaty, Governor Francisco Luis Héctor de Carondelet established a new administrative center in the Red River Valley with Grand Pré as lieutenant governor in Avoyelles. After arriving in the new district, Grand Pré conducted a tour of the territory, travelling upriver to Rapidó (Note: In the vicinity of modern Alexandria/Pineville, Louisiana; it was established by the French as Poste des Rapides.) and Natchitoches and then east to the Ouachita settlement. In his reports to Carondelet, Grand Pré described relationships with and among the Native American peoples of the region, existing trade (both licensed and unlicensed) and the need to ensure defense of settlements and waterways. He recommended the relocation of Spanish military and settlers from Natchez to the region, but the plans never came to fruition.

=== Political career ===
In 1799, Grand Pré was appointed governor of the Baton Rouge District of West Florida. The 1803 Sale of Louisiana brought new challenges to Grand Pré and Spanish West Florida. American fillibusters and bandits raided West Florida from the Orleans and Mississippi territories. A large number of Anglo-Americans settled in West Florida after 1787, swearing an oath of allegiance to the Spanish king and receiving land so long as they successfully cultivated it; by 1799 at least 161 plots had been assigned in the Baton Rouge District. After a failed business partnership, American settler Reuben Kemper and his brothers launched a series of raids against landholders in Feliciana in the summer of 1804. Grand Pré organized local militia to capture Kemper and his gang, and Kemper published declaration of independence in hopes of spurring a popular uprising against Spain. The Kempers captured Vicente Sebastian Pintado, the surveyor general and Grand Pré's representative in Feliciana, but they lost the element of surprise and the local militia deterred them from continuing on to attack Baton Rouge. The Kempers retired to Pinckneyville, just over the line in the Mississippi Territory, from where they kept up a running battle with the Spanish. Although Grand Pré offered pardons to some landowners who participated in the rebellion, the Kempers were denied a pardon.

In 1805, Grand Pré proposed allowing the Isleño settlers of Galvez Town to relocate to the new settlement of Spanish Town in the Baton Rouge District. He drew up the layout of an area east of the fort "out of cannon shot" for the settlement.

The lawlessness that characterized the Kempers' raids continued to plague West Florida as bandits, filibusterers, and others tried to encourage Anglo-Americans in the territory to join with the United States end Spanish rule in the territory (as well as in East Florida and Texas). Increasingly, the American control of New Orleans and the west bank of the Mississippi, as well as changes in Spanish management of the territory in the wake of the Kemper Rebellion led to greater dissatisfaction of Ango-American settlers with Spanish rule. In part due to his handling of the Kempers, Grand Pré was recalled to Havana by the captain-general in 1809 for questioning over his policies against the inhabitants. He died in Cuba that year while awaiting trial; according to his friend Pedro Favrot, he was executed for "pro-French" activities.

== Personal life ==
Grand Pré married Helen Prisque Paget in New Orleans on April 1, 1784. Prior to this marriage, Grand Pré had at least one acknowledged "natural child", Celeste Olympe, from a previous relationship with a free woman of color in Point Coupée named Jeanette Glapion. Through Celeste Olympe, Grand Pré is a direct ancestor of Pope Leo XIV. A total of 12 children were mentioned in his will at the time of probate in 1811.
