= Galveztown =

Galveztown may refer to:

- Gálveztown (brig sloop), a famous ship in the fleet of the Spanish Empire.
- Galveztown, Louisiana, an 18th-century settlement near present-day Galvez, Louisiana.
- The original name of Galveston, Texas

== See also ==
- Galveston (disambiguation)
