= USS Morris =

USS Morris may refer to the following ships of the United States Navy:

- USS Morris (1778), was a frigate in service from 1778 until wrecked in 1779
- USS Morris (1779), was a schooner acquired in 1779 which operated on the Mississippi River during the American Revolutionary War
- USS Morris (1846a), was a schooner in service from early 1846 until wrecked in October 1846
- USS Morris (1846b), was a schooner in service from 1846 to 1848
- USS Morris (TB-14), was a torpedo boat commissioned in 1898 and decommissioned in 1919
- USS Morris (DD-271), was a Clemson-class destroyer commissioned in 1919 and decommissioned in 1922
- USS Morris (DD-417), was a Sims-class destroyer commissioned in 1940 and decommissioned in 1945
- USS Morris (PC-1179), was a patrol craft commissioned as USS PC-1179 in 1943, decommissioned in 1946, renamed Morris in 1956, and struck from the Navy List in 1960

== See also ==
- USS Commodore Morris, a Union Navy ferryboat during the American Civil War
- USCS Morris
- USS Morrison (DD-560)
- USS Morristown (ID-3580)
- Mr. Morris, ex-USS AFDM-2, an auxiliary floating drydock in Port Arthur, Texas
