= Battle of Galveston (disambiguation) =

The Battle of Galveston (sometimes called the Second Battle of Galveston) was a battle during the American Civil War on January 1, 1863, at Galveston, Texas.

Battle of Galveston or Battle of Galveston Harbor may also refer to:

- Action off Galveston Light, a short naval battle near Galveston Lighthouse on January 11, 1863
- Battle of Galveston Harbor (1837), a naval engagement between the Republic of Texas and Mexico
- Battle of Galveston Harbor (1862), the capture of Galveston by the Union without any casualties, October 4, 1862, sometimes called the First Battle of Galveston

== See also ==
- Galveston (disambiguation)
