= Marie-Félicité de Saint-Maxent =

Spanish-Creole noblewoman and wife of Governor Bernardo de Gálvez

Countess of Gálvez Marie-Félicité de Saint-Maxent
- Born: December 27, 1755; New Orleans, French Louisiana
- Died: c. 1800; Aranjuez, near Madrid, Kingdom of Spain
- Spouse: Jean Baptiste d'Estrehan (m.176? d.1765) Bernardo de Gálvez (m.1777 d.1786)
- Parents: Gilbert Antoine de Saint-Maxent (father); Elizabeth La Roche (mother)

Marie-Félicité de Saint-Maxent (December 27, 1755 - c. 1800) was a French-Creole noblewoman and the wife of Bernardo de Gálvez, the 5th Spanish Governor of New Orleans from 1777 to 1783.

== Biography ==
=== Early life ===
Marie was born to Gilbert Antoine de Saint-Maxent (1724–1794) and Elizabeth La Roche. When Elizabeth was six years old she was placed in an arranged marriage with Jean Baptiste d'Estrehan, the son of Jean-Baptiste d'Estrehan de Beaupré. However, Jean Baptiste died in 1765, leaving Marie a widow. Marie was known for her youthful beauty and even attracted the admiration of the famed German scientist Alexander von Humboldt.

=== Marriage with Bernardo de Gálvez ===
On November 2, 1777, Marie married Bernardo de Gálvez, the 5th Spanish governor of Spanish Louisiana. Marie had 3 children with Bernardo: Matilda (b. 1778 in New Orleans), Miguel (b. 1782 in Haiti) and Guadalupe (b. 1786 in Mexico City). During the American Revolutionary War, Bernardo traveled north to help fight the British with the Americans 1779 to 1783. When Bernardo returned later that year, he was appointed as the 49th Viceroy of New Spain and moved the family down to Mexico due to his occupation. During Bernardo's reign, he oversaw a famine in 1786 and with his wife, helped aid the starving Mexican population. On November 30, 1786, Bernardo died in Mexico City, aged 40.

== Later life and death ==
Following the death of her husband, Marie traveled to Madrid and lived there for several years. In 1790, she asked a friend and French banker named Francisco de Cabarrús to deliver some jewels to her from the French embassy which he did. On September 11, 1790, Marie was visited by Spanish authorities and was banished from Madrid and settled in Valladolid where she was heavily monitored by Spanish police. Eventually she was allowed to settle in Zaragoza until June 1793, when Marie was allowed back into Madrid where she died around the year 1800.
