= William Pickles =

William Pickles may refer to:

- William Pickles (doctor)
- William Pickles (American Revolution)
- William Pickles (trade unionist)
