= Count of Gálvez =

Countship of Gálvez
- Creation date: 28 May 1783
- Created by: Charles III
- Peerage: Peerage of Spain
- First holder: Bernardo de Gálvez y Madrid, 1st Count of Gálvez
- Present holder: Pedro María Alarcón de la Lastra y Romero, 9th Count of Gálvez

Count of Gálvez (Spanish: Conde de Gálvez) is a hereditary title in the peerage of Spain, granted in 1783 by King Charles III to Bernardo de Gálvez, 1st Viscount of Gálvez-Town, hero of the American Revolutionary War and later viceroy of New Spain, an office he succeeded his father in.

Lady Dorothy Elizabeth Mary Walpole, eldest daughter of the 4th Earl of Orford, was married to the 5th Count of Gálvez.

== Counts of Gálvez (1783) ==
- Bernardo de Gálvez y Madrid, 1st Count of Gálvez (1746-1786)
- Miguel de Gálvez y Saint Maxent, 2nd Count of Gálvez (1782-1825), eldest son of the 1st Count
- Matilde Gálvez y Saint Maxent, 3rd Countess of Gálvez (1778-1839), eldest daughter of the 1st Count
- Paulina Capete y Gálvez, 4th Countess of Gálvez (1803-1877), eldest daughter of the 3rd Countess
- Ernesto del Balzo y Capece, 5th Count of Gálvez (1845-1930), eldest son of the 4th Countess
- Adelaida del Balzo y Capece, 6th Countess of Gálvez (1843-1932), eldest daughter of the 4th Countess
- Luis Alarcón de la Lastra, 7th Count of Gálvez (1891-1971), direct descendant of the 1st Count
- Joaquín Alarcón de la Lastra y Domínguez, 8th Count of Gálvez (1926-1990), eldest son of the 7th Count
- Pedro María Alarcón de la Lastra y Romero, 9th Count of Gálvez, eldest son of the 8th Count

== See also ==
- Galveztown, Louisiana
- Galveston, Texas

== Bibliography ==
- Hidalgos de España, Real Asociación de (2018). Elenco de Grandezas y Títulos Nobiliarios Españoles. Ediciones Hidalguía. ISBN 978-84-94841-02-6.
