= Luis de Unzaga =

Spanish colonial governor and administrator (1717–1793)

Luis de Unzaga le Conciliateur
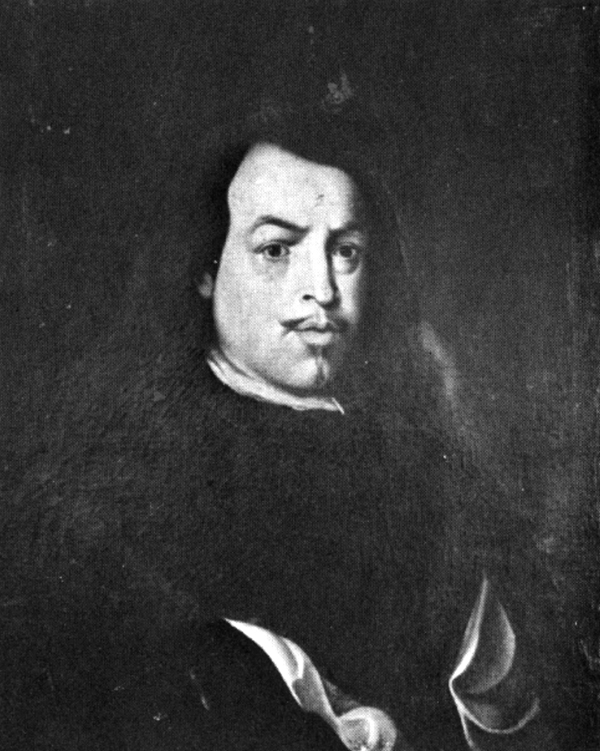

4th Spanish Governor of Louisiana
- In office December 1769 – 1 January 1777
- Monarch: Charles III
- First Secretary of State: Jerónimo Grimaldi; Count of Floridablanca
- Secretary of State for Indies: Julián de Arriaga y Ribera; Marquess of Sonora
- Viceroy of New Spain: Carlos Francisco de Croix; Antonio María de Bucareli y Ursúa
- Captain General of Cuba: Diego José Navarro García de Valladares (as interim); Felipe de Fonsdeviela
- Preceded by: Alejandro O'Reilly
- Succeeded by: Bernardo de Gálvez

1st Captain General of Venezuela
- In office 17 June 1777 – 10 December 1782
- Monarch: Charles III
- First Secretary of State: Count of Floridablanca
- Secretary of State for Indies: Marquess of Sonora
- Viceroy of New Granada: Manuel Antonio Flórez; Real Audiencia of Santa Fe de Bogotá; Juan de Torrezar Díaz Pimienta
- Preceded by: José Carlos de Agüero (as Governor of Venezuela)
- Succeeded by: Pedro de Nava

69th Governor of Cuba
- In office 29 December 1782 – 4 February 1785
- Monarch: Charles III
- First Secretary of State: Count of Floridablanca
- Secretary of State for Indies: Marquess of Sonora
- Viceroy of New Spain: Martín de Mayorga; Matías de Gálvez y Gallardo; Vicente de Herrera y Rivero (as Regent of the Audiencia)
- Preceded by: Juan Manuel de Cagigal y Monserrat
- Succeeded by: Bernardo Troncoso Martínez del Rincón

Personal details
- Born: Luis de Unzaga y Amézaga; April 6, 1717 Málaga, Spain
- Died: June 21, 1793 (aged 76) Málaga, Spain
- Spouse: Marie Elizabeth de St. Maxent La Roche

Military service
- Allegiance: Viceroyalty of New Spain; Kingdom of Spain
- Branch/service: Spanish Army
- Years of service: 1732–1793
- Rank: Captain General
- Battles/wars: American Revolution, Seven Years' War, War of Jenkins' Ear, War of the Polish Succession, Spanish conquest of Oran (1732)

Luis de Unzaga y Amézaga (1717–1793), also known as Louis Unzaga y Amezéga le Conciliateur, Luigi de Unzaga Panizza and Lewis de Onzaga, was governor of Spanish Louisiana from late 1769 to mid-1777, as well as a Captain General of Venezuela from 1777 to 1782 and Cuba from 1782 to 1785.

== Biography ==
Unzaga was born in Málaga, Spain, the son of a well-known Basque family. He served in the Italian war of 1735 and went to Havana in 1740, where he was appointed lieutenant governor of Puerto del Príncipe, Cuba (now Camagüey) and later of Santiago de Cuba. During the Seven Years' War he participated in the 1762 siege of Havana, where he surrendered to a force of British besiegers.

Unzaga accompanied Alejandro O'Reilly to New Orleans in 1769 to put down the Rebellion of 1768 by French and German colonists objecting to the cession of Louisiana to Spain via the Treaty of Fontainebleau of 1762. Following the formal establishment of the cabildo (council), Unzaga became governor on December 1, 1769. In 1775, he married Elizabeth St. Maxent, the first daughter of Gilbert Antoine de St. Maxent, a wealthy and well-connected Creole merchant.

In 1776, the year the Declaration of Independence was signed, George Washington wrote to his friend Colonel Joseph Reed of a letter that he had received from General Charles Lee. Lee noted that he had received a “most flattering letter” from Unzaga who referred to Lee as "General de Los Estados Unidos Americanos" (General of the American United States), one of the first times that the colonies were recognized with this term.

Luis de Unzaga was one of the driving forces behind the birth of the United States, for which he made use of a robust secret network of family contacts. Unzaga was informed of the arrival of British troops to America and made every effort to help George Washington.

Unzaga was noted for allowing open trade. During the summer of 1776, he secretly helped Patrick Henry and the Americans by privately delivering five tons of gunpowder from the king's stores to Captain George Gibson and Lieutenant Linn of the Virginia Council of Defense. The gunpowder was moved up the Mississippi under the protection of the flag of Spain, and was used to thwart British plans to capture Fort Pitt in Pennsylvania.

Unzaga was the first Spanish official to provide direct military aid to the Continental Army during the American Revolution. After repeated requests from New Orleans merchant Oliver Pollock, Unzaga approved the secret transfer of a load of gunpowder up the Mississippi and Ohio rivers to Fort Pitt, where it arrived in May 1777. Later, additional supplies were shipped from New Orleans to Philadelphia. Pollock provided the vessels for both shipments.

From June 17, 1777, to December 10, 1782, Unzaga served as Captain General of Venezuela. In 1783 he became governor of Cuba, where one of his first actions was ordering a halt to the unrestrained cutting of cedar trees. As Governor of Cuba and Captain General of Havana, a position he would hold until 1785, in April 1783 he received Prince William of the United Kingdom, the future King William IV, with whom he reached preliminary agreements for the Treaty of Paris (1783). Later he continued to attend to the requests for help from George Washington and Robert Morris to finally achieve the birth of the United States of America. After his retirement, he returned to his native Málaga, where he occupied as Lieutenant General the General Command of the coasts of Granada. Their residences would serve as the consular agency of the United States of America in Málaga after the port of Málaga started free trade with the United States of America.

== Legacy ==
In 2023, the Spanish postal service, Correos, issued a postage stamp honoring Unzaga.

Preceded by Alejandro O'Reilly	Spanish Governor of Louisiana; 1769 – 1777	Succeeded by Bernardo de Gálvez y Madrid, Count of Gálvez
Preceded by José Carlos de Agüero; As Governor of Venezuela	Captains General of Venezuela; 1777 – 1782	Succeeded by Pedro de Nava
Preceded by Juan Manuel de Cagigal y Monserrat	Spanish Governor of Cuba; 1782 – 1785	Succeeded by Bernardo Troncoso Martínez del Rincón
