= Gálveztown (brig sloop) =

History

Royal Navy
- Name: HMS West Florida
- Commissioned: 17 February 1776
- Captured: Captured by Continental Navy at the Battle of Lake Pontchartrain

United States
- Name: Bergantín Gálveztown
- Namesake: Bernardo de Gálvez
- Decommissioned: June 1780
- Renamed: Gálveztown
- Fate: Deemed unsuitable for navigation and was sold
- Commander: William Pickles

Spain
- Builder: Sanchez-Guitard, Juan Antonio at the Nereo Shipyard

General characteristics
- Type: Brigantine
- Length: Original: 53 ft (16 m) on deck; Replica: 68 ft (21 m) on deck
- Decks: one
- Propulsion: Sails
- Crew: 58
- Armament: 14 × 6-pounder guns + 12 swivel guns

Gálveztown, originally HMS West Florida, was a two–masted brigantine which the Continental Navy schooner USS Morris captured at the Battle of Lake Pontchartrain, which was then in the British province of West Florida. West Florida became Gálveztown, supposedly under the command of Bernardo de Gálvez, the Spanish governor of Louisiana (New Spain).

There are claims that she participated in the siege and capture of Pensacola in March 1781. However, documentary evidence suggests that she arrived in Philadelphia with cargo on 1 June 1780, and therefore could not have participated in this action in March 1781.

== Historic significance ==
The coat of arms of Bernardo de Gálvez was augmented with a depiction of the brigantine Galveztown by a spanish royal decree in 1783

The vessel, described as a two-masted brigantine, square-rigged on the foremast, with fore-and-aft sails on the mainmast, was originally commissioned as a 14-gun cutter named West Florida after being built by the British in New England, and later was an armed brig-sloop and the only armed British vessel patrolling the lakes and Mississippi Sound. She had taken several American rebel smugglers as prizes under Lieutenant John Payne, RN.

As such she posed a threat to the expected shipment of arms and military supplies that Benjamin Franklin had contracted from the Spanish firm of José Gardoqui & Sons to ship: "215 bronze cannon, 4,000 field tents, 12,826 grenades, 30,00 [3,000 or 30,000?] bayonets, 30,000 uniforms, 51,314 musket balls, and 300,000 pounds of gunpowder from a French port by way of Bermuda to Boston". Spain also provided almost eight million reales (currency) with which all types of supplies were purchased and sent by way of the Mississippi and Ohio rivers to General Washington and George Rogers Clark.

After intercepting a secret communication to the British General, Gálvez formulated a plan to attack the British forces once Spain declared war on Britain. After HMS West Florida took three boats that the Spanish claimed to be theirs, the Spanish Governor used this as a pretext and reacted by seizing eleven British vessels on the river at the time, claiming them to be smugglers. One of the vessels was a British-registered Norton, captained by a colonial William Pickles. Hiring American rebels to capture the British vessel, on 10 September 1779 Captain William Pickles in Morris, assisted by a detachment of the local American marines, captured the British sloop West Florida, which had controlled Lake Pontchartrain during the early part of the war preying on American shipping in the lake.

It seems the strength of the British defenders was not great because another source reported that,

On Lake Pontchartrain, an English privateer was taken, and the Spanish gun-boats captured at Galveston three schooners and a small brig, which were returning to Pensacola; also on the Mississippi two cutters, loaded with provisions for the English.

This suggests that British vessels were undermanned, and had some guns removed since she was reported with only four 2 1/2-pounder guns. one 1 1/2-pounder gun and her swivels as a prize. The British vessel was only recently advised of the state of war with Spain, and the American captain used a "strategem" to approach her within a few days of the declaration of war. Overhauling West Florida, Pickles ordered her to surrender. The English captain, Payne, laughed at him. Shots were exchanged simultaneously. Account of the action suggests the British crew put up a significant resistance and surrendered only after her commander, Lieutenant John Payne, was mortally wounded in the engagement.

Although she was rigged as a sloop-of-war, the new Spanish owners converted her to a square-rigged brig sloop. Some confusion exists as to whether it was the former West Florida that joined the Spanish squadron for the attack on Pensacola, and later participated in the capture of Mobile, Alabama.

== Fate ==
It seems that Pickles was ordered to collect cargo of tafia and sugar, and deliver this to Philadelphia, his home port, immediately after her capture. Soon after she arrived at Philadelphia in June 1780 she was judged unsuitable for navigation, and sold.

However, some claim that on 23 April 1789, Gálveztown was the only foreign ship in New York Harbor, and saluted the first inauguration of George Washington. One such report says, "The ships at anchor in the harbor, dressed in colors, fired salvos as it passed. One alone, the Galveston, a Spanish man-of-war, displayed no signs of gratulation, until the barge of the general was nearly abreast; when suddenly as if by magic, the yards were manned, the ship burst forth, as it were, into a full array of flags and signals, and thundered a salute of thirteen guns." Standing at Washington's side at the presidential inaugural parade was Spain's first ambassador to the United States, Diego de Gardoqui, and perhaps this claim was made to link the Spanish campaign in the South with the president.

== Replica ==
A replica of the brig was laid down in 2009 in Astilleros Nereo shipyards, close to the Baños del Carmen, outside Málaga, Spain, and is scheduled for launching in 2011. Tons of live oak were shipped from the U.S. to Spain to be used in the replica, including 17 tons from the Galveston area from the thousands of trees felled by Hurricane Ike.

The project is sponsored in part by the Lighthouse Archaeological Maritime Program and St. Augustine Lighthouse & Museum in St. Augustine, Florida, for the 450th founding of the city celebration. Partners for this project include Astilleros Nereo, City of Málaga in Spain, Spanish Red Cross, Nyhael Consulting, University of Málaga, Astilleros Bermeo, Escuela Técnica Superior de Ingenieros Navales de Madrid, City of Avilés in Spain, Daughters of American Revolution, United States Embassy in Spain, Abyssal Pictures, and Fundación Nao Victoria. Additional partners include Málaga Port Authority, Gráficas Urania, St. Augustine Lighthouse & Museum, St. Augustine Historical Society, Galveston Chapter of Granaderos y Damas de Gálvez, University of West Florida, City of Galveston, and Beck Disaster Recovery.

The replica was designed to be 68 feet on deck, although the original brig was 53 feet on deck. A reconstruction of two 14' British yawls (ship's boat) based on a 1760 Royal Navy design are built in St. Augustine to be exchanged for identical boats built in Spain for used with the replica. The vessel is intended to be crewed with a combined U.S. and Spanish crew, and will be used as a training vessel during cruises between Málaga and St. Augustine.

== See also ==
- Battle of Fort Charlotte (1780)
- Battle of Lake Pontchartrain (1779)
- Bernardo de Gálvez
- Gálveztown, Louisiana
- List of museum ships
- List of schooners
- Museum ship
- Ship replica
