= Gilbert Antoine de St. Maxent =

French military officer

Gilbert Antoine de St. Maxent (also spelled Saint–Maxent; 1724 – August 8, 1794) was a French merchant and military officer who played a major role in the development of French and Spanish Louisiana.

St. Maxent was born in Longwy, Meurthe-et-Moselle, in Lorraine, France.

In 1747 he moved to New Orleans, the French colonial capital of Lower Louisiana. He enlisted in the French Army and in 1749 married the wealthy Elizabeth La Roche (1734–1809), with whom he had nine children, including Maximilien François de St. Maxent, who became a colonial governor of West Florida, Elizabeth St Maxent, wife of governor Luis de Unzaga, and Felicite de Saint Maxent, wife of governor Bernardo de Galvez. He used the dowry to open a business on Conti Street to supply fur traders.

In 1753 he was promoted to colonel and commandant of the Louisiana Regiment, by Governor Louis de Billouart Kerlerec. He was to distinguish himself in battles defending Louisiana against incursions by the British and Chickasaw in the French and Indian War during the Seven Years' War.

== Founding of St. Louis ==
In 1755 Kerlerec gave St. Maxent exclusive rights to deal with Native Americans west of the Mississippi River.

St. Maxent's most ambitious effort was the formation of Maxent, Laclède & Company in which he gave 25 percent ownership to Pierre Laclède. In 1763 LaClede selected a site on a bluff above the west side of the Mississippi River, just south of the confluence of the Mississippi and Missouri Rivers, for a settlement that was to be called Saint Louis. According to legend, work on clearing the site began on Saint Valentine's Day of 1764.

St. Louis was founded before news arrived that in the Treaty of Paris (1763), which ended the French and Indian War, Spain would take over France's possessions on the west of the Mississippi River and that the British were to assume control over French possessions on the east side of the river. After the news arrived, French colonists on the east side of the river moved to the west side, at St. Louis.

== Rebellion of 1768 ==
St. Maxent, whose fortune was tied to France, was to have his loyalties severely tested in the transition from French to Spanish control.

St. Maxent was one of the first Frenchmen to pledge his allegiance to the new Spanish governor, Antonio de Ulloa, and Ulloa was named godfather of one of St. Maxent's daughters. St. Maxent entered into contracts to supply Spanish frigates. When the Creole and German settlers around New Orleans resisted Spanish rule in the Rebellion of 1768, they imprisoned St. Maxent at his plantation from October 25 to 29, 1768, releasing him after Ulloa was forced out of the city to return to Spain.

In January 1769, St. Maxent thwarted the plotters' efforts to enlist Native Americans in the planned resistance to any Spanish attempt to reclaim New Orleans.

In May 1769, the partnership with Laclede was dissolved, with Laclede buying the St. Louis facilities for 80,000 livres and the first payment due in June 1771.

In August 1769, Alejandro O'Reilly restored Spanish authority in New Orleans, putting down the rebellion and executing five ringleaders while imprisoning five others. O'Relly abolished the Superior Council, which had governed Louisiana during the French period, replacing it with the Spanish cabildo and replacing the French laws with the Spanish code.

O'Reilly gave St. Maxent a new patent for the fur business, for the firm St. Maxent and Ranson. This firm, which rivaled Laclède's, was to contribute to Laclède's declining fortunes in St. Louis.

St. Maxent's first daughter, Marie-Elizabeth de St. Maxent, married the next Spanish governor Luis de Unzaga, in 1775. His second daughter Marie-Félicité de St. Maxent d'Estrehan, a wealthy widow, married Unzaga's successor, Bernardo de Gálvez. Galvez was to succeed his father later as Viceroy of New Spain.

During this period it is believed that St. Maxent was the richest man in the entire territory. He built a series of lavish homes.

In the Great New Orleans Fire of 1788 which destroyed most of the city's buildings, St. Maxent was officially commended by the Spanish for opening his home to many refugees and for selling supplies to the Spanish at the same price as before the fire.

== American Revolution ==
During the American Revolutionary War Spain sided with the French and United States against the British and St. Maxent was placed in charge of the militia (but not Spanish regulars), which saw action in the Gulf Coast campaign, including the Capture of Fort Bute, the Battle of Baton Rouge (which resulted in the capture of both Fort New Richmond and Fort Panmure (future Natchez, Mississippi), the Battle of Fort Charlotte (1780), and ultimately the Siege of Pensacola (1781).

For his actions, he was named Commandant of the Militia of Louisiana, Lt. Governor of the provinces of Louisiana and West Florida, Captain-General of the new Bureau of Indian Affairs of Louisiana and West Florida.

In 1782, he traveled to Spain to get concessions from King Carlos III, including permission to import slaves without paying duty. As part of the negotiation, he agreed not to export specie (gold bars).

While returning to Louisiana in 1782, his two ships and crew were captured by British naval forces and sent to Kingston, Jamaica, where St. Maxent was held under house arrest and his men put in prison. They obtained lenient treatment through bribes. The revolutionary war ended with the Treaty of Paris, and St. Maxent's fortunes quickly soured. One of his British benefactors was arrested in Havana, St. Maxent was implicated in smuggling specie (gold), and the Spanish revoked his titles and embargoed his property.

Adding to his woes, his New Orleans warehouse was destroyed in the Great New Orleans Fire of 1788, and in 1789 he was again arrested by Governor Esteban Rodríguez Miró. St. Maxent eventually cleared himself of the charges, but the process tied him up for the rest of his life.

The next Spanish governor, Francisco Luis Héctor de Carondelet, called him back to military duty to help build Fort San Felipe. Carondelet recommended that he be promoted to Brigadier General, but he died in 1794.

== Bibliography ==
- Gilbert Antoine de St. Maxent: The Spanish-Frenchman of New Orleans by James J. Coleman Jr., 2001. ISBN 0-911116-06-0
- El gobernador Luis de Unzaga (1717-1793) Precursor en el nacimiento de los EE.UU. y en el liberalismo. by Cazorla, Frank (Coord.) Coautores: Cazorla-Granados, F. J. : Fundación Málaga, Málaga, 2020. pp. 49, 54, 63–65, 70, 150, 207. ISBN 9788409124107
