= Luis Alarcón de la Lastra =

Spanish businessperson and politician (1891–1971)

Luis Alarcón de la Lastra (3rd marqués de Rende and 7th Conde de Gálvez) (24 November 1891 – 19 November 1971) was a Spanish army officer, deputy, businessperson, Spanish Civil War commander under Francisco Franco, governor of Madrid and then government minister. He owned large areas of land around Carmona, province of province of Seville.

== Biography ==
He was born in Seville. He studied at the Real Colegio de Artillería from 1907 and was promoted to second lieutenant in 1912. After a posting in Melilla, he worked in Algeciras and Seville, becoming captain in 1927. When the Second Spanish Republic began, he refused an oath of loyalty to the new Republic and left the army. He began working in an agricultural business in Carmona. In 1933, he was vice president of the Agrarian Employers' Federation. He became a diputado of the Partido Agrario Español (Spanish Agrarian Party) – made up of right-wing monarchist elements – for Seville. In 1935, he joined a number of Confederación Española de Derechas Autónomas (CEDA) deputies of the Cortes in a right-wing coalition led by José María Lamamié de Clairac y Colina in support of their landowner-dominated traditions and specifically in opposition to a law from Manuel Giménez Fernández (also a CEDA diputado) which provided that peasants who had worked land for twelve years were given the opportunity He was not able to win a seat in the elections of February 1936.

When the Spanish Civil War commenced in 1936, he rejoined the army on 18 July under general Gonzalo Queipo de Llano, commanding groups of falangists operating in working-class suburbs of Seville with artillery fire. Most of the falangists were from the Real Círculo de Labradores, a Sevillian aristocratic landowners' organisation which he became president of in the 1940s. On 8 August, leading the 9th battery of the third light regiment, he joined the ruthless commander Antonio Castejón Espinosa. Alarcón de la Lastra directed artillery which bombarded towns as part of the Nationalists' advance; bombing from the air was also used. Where the resistance to the bombardment was strong it was followed up with the usage of human shields, but in any case the abuse and killings were extreme. Alarcón de la Lastra was thereafter involved in all actions on the march to Madrid, including the Battle of Badajoz and the capture of Toledo. This advance was later under the command of Juan Yagüe (known as the "Butcher of Badajoz" after that particular ensuing massacre), whose forces had joined the Nationalists from Ceuta. On 19 November, he was injured twice at the front of his battery. Thereafter he remained at the vanguard or in charge of artillery as in Teruel in the Galician army corps. In 1937, he was promoted first to commander and then lieutenant-colonel. By late 1937, he was in command of the Moroccan Army Corps artillery.

In March 1939, Nationalist victor Franco rewarded him by making him governor of Madrid and in August Minister of Industry and Commerce until 1940. He was also promoted to colonel in 1940, brigadier-general in 1952 and major-general in 1957. He received the collective Laureate Cross of Saint Ferdinand in the Morocco campaign, the Military medal, three medals of suffering for the fatherland, the medal of the maimed, a medal, plaque and grand cross of the Royal and Military Order of Saint Hermenegild and four military crosses. From 1943 to 1967 he was designated procurador en Cortes, a title replaced by diputado or senador in modern Spain. He was part of the government delegation in the Guadalquvir Hydrographic Confederation. He promoted social housing for officials and dedicated a conference to the protection of the Guadalquivir river.

== Death and legacy ==
He died in Seville on 19 November 1971, survived by twelve children. On 16 February 2012, the city council of Seville instigated a change of name of an avenue which had previously been named in his honour, the avenida General Luis Alarcón de la Lastra in Seville, to avenida Parque Amate. This was in line with what is commonly referred to in Spain as the Ley de Memoria Histórica (Law of Historical Memory) which gives rights to the victims and descendants of victims of the Spanish Civil War.
