= William Pickles (American Revolution) =

Military officer in the US

William Pickles (died September 9, 1783) was an American military officer who served with the Continental Navy during the American Revolutionary War.

Commissioned on October 10, 1776, he was active on the Gulf Coast. He was given command of Morris (1778), a British ship that had been captured on the Mississippi River, in 1779, but she was destroyed by a hurricane. He was then given another ship, also called Morris (1779), by Bernardo de Gálvez, the governor of Spanish Louisiana, to deal with British military shipping on Lake Pontchartrain. In September 1779 he captured a British ship. He then took over command of the prize, HMS West Florida, with instructions from Oliver Pollock, Congress's agent in New Orleans, to assist Gálvez in a planned expedition to capture the West Florida port of Mobile. The ship was re-rigged and renamed Gálveztown. Following that successful expedition, he sailed on to Philadelphia, where the ship was sold.

Pickles was then given command of Mercury, and charged with transporting Henry Laurens to the Dutch Republic on a diplomatic mission. The ship was captured off the coast of Newfoundland, and while Laurens were imprisoned in London, Pickles was imprisoned in Mill Prison in Plymouth. Pickles escaped from Mill on May 16, 1781, and eventually returned to Philadelphia. He died in Philadelphia on September 9, 1783, after being assaulted by a gang of Italian sailors.

The prosecution of his murderers was complicated by a legal question: whether statutes previously enacted by the British Parliament were still in force in the now independent state of Pennsylvania. Two of the sailors were sentenced on October 8, 1783, to hang ten days later.

== Sources ==
- Allen, Gardner Ward. A Naval History of the American Revolution, Volume 2
- Laurens, Henry, et al. The Papers of Henry Laurens, Volume 15
- Reports of cases ruled and adjudged in the courts of Pennsylvania, before and since the Revolution, Volume 1
- Pennsylvania Colonial Records, Volume 13
