= USS Morris (1779) =

History

United States
- Name: USS Morris
- Namesake: Robert Morris (1734-1806), American politician and signer of the Declaration of Independence
- Acquired: 1779

General characteristics
- Type: Schooner
- Propulsion: Sails

USS Morris was a schooner of the Continental Navy placed in commission in 1779. She was named for Founding Father, Continental Congressman, and a major financier of the American Revolutionary War, Robert Morris.

Morris was presented to Oliver Pollock by Governor Bernardo de Gálvez of Spanish Louisiana in the summer of 1779 for the use of American forces on the Mississippi River. Armed and commanded by Captain William Pickles, Morris operated on the Mississippi and nearby waters against British commerce. In September 1779 she captured British sloop HMS West Florida in the Battle of Lake Pontchartrain after a severe conflict.
