= Spanish Town, Baton Rouge, Louisiana =

Historic district in Louisiana, United States

- Spanish Town
- U.S. National Register of Historic Places
- U.S. Historic district
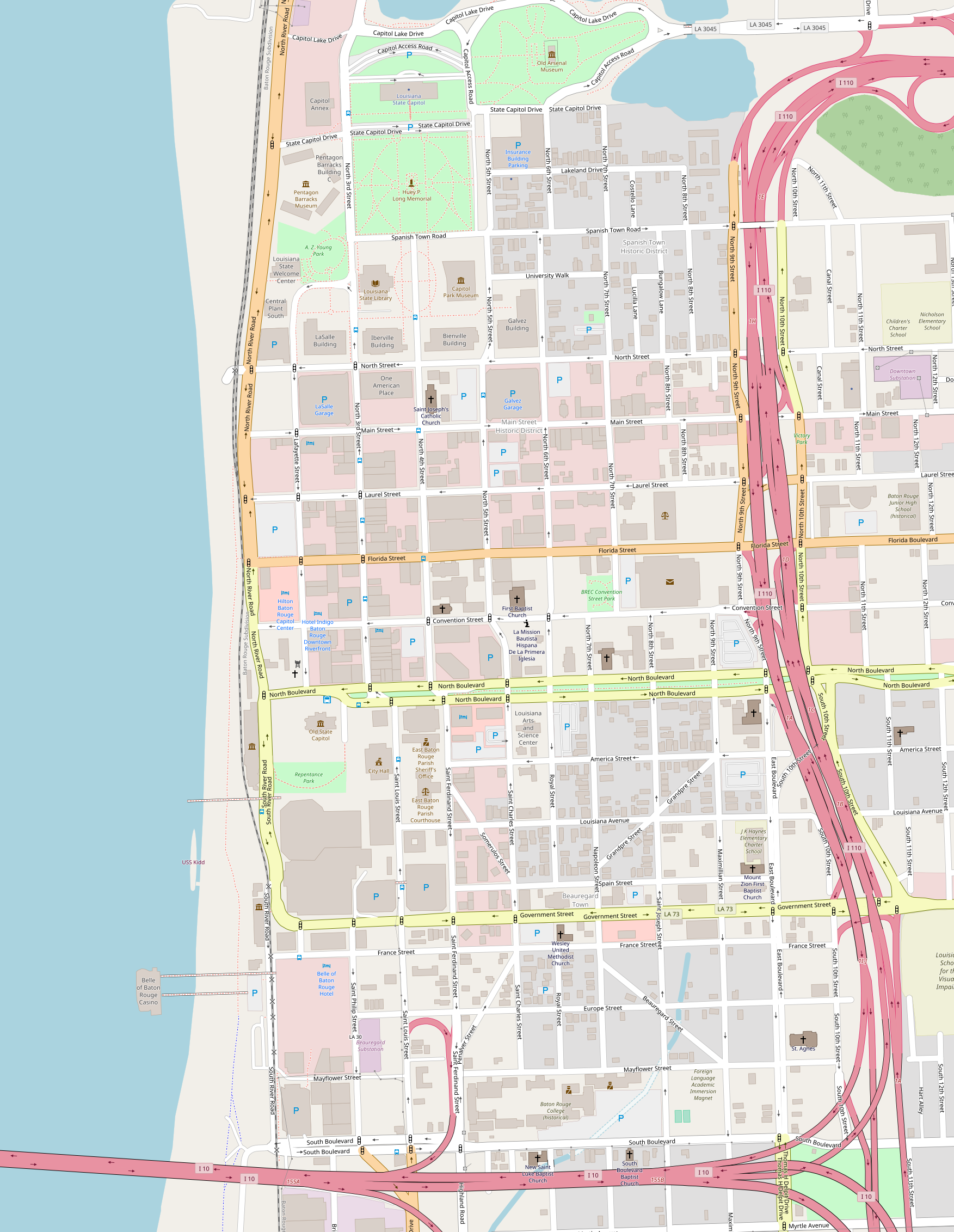
- Location within Baton Rouge Downtown

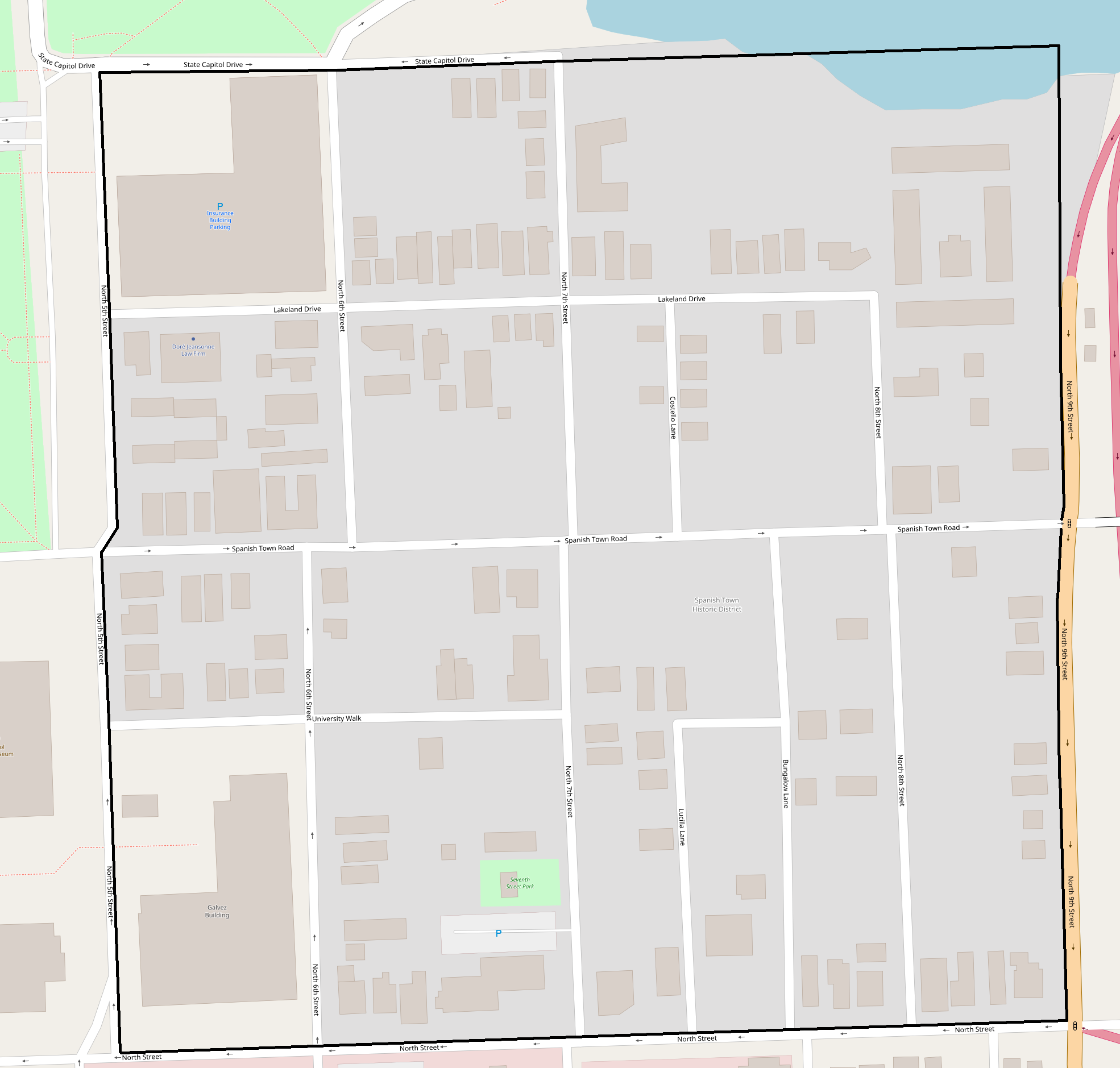
- Location: Bounded by State Capitol Drive, North 5th Street, North 9th Street and North Street, Baton Rouge, Louisiana
- Coordinates: 30°27′17″N 91°11′01″W
- Area: 49.4 acres (20.0 ha)
- Built: 1862
- Architect: Potts, Nelson, et al.
- Architectural style: Bungalow/American craftsman, Greek Revival, Late Victorian architecture
- NRHP reference No.: 78001422
- Added to NRHP: August 31, 1978

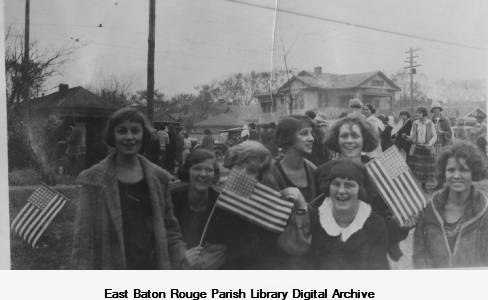
Spanish Town, Baton Rouge on Armistice Day

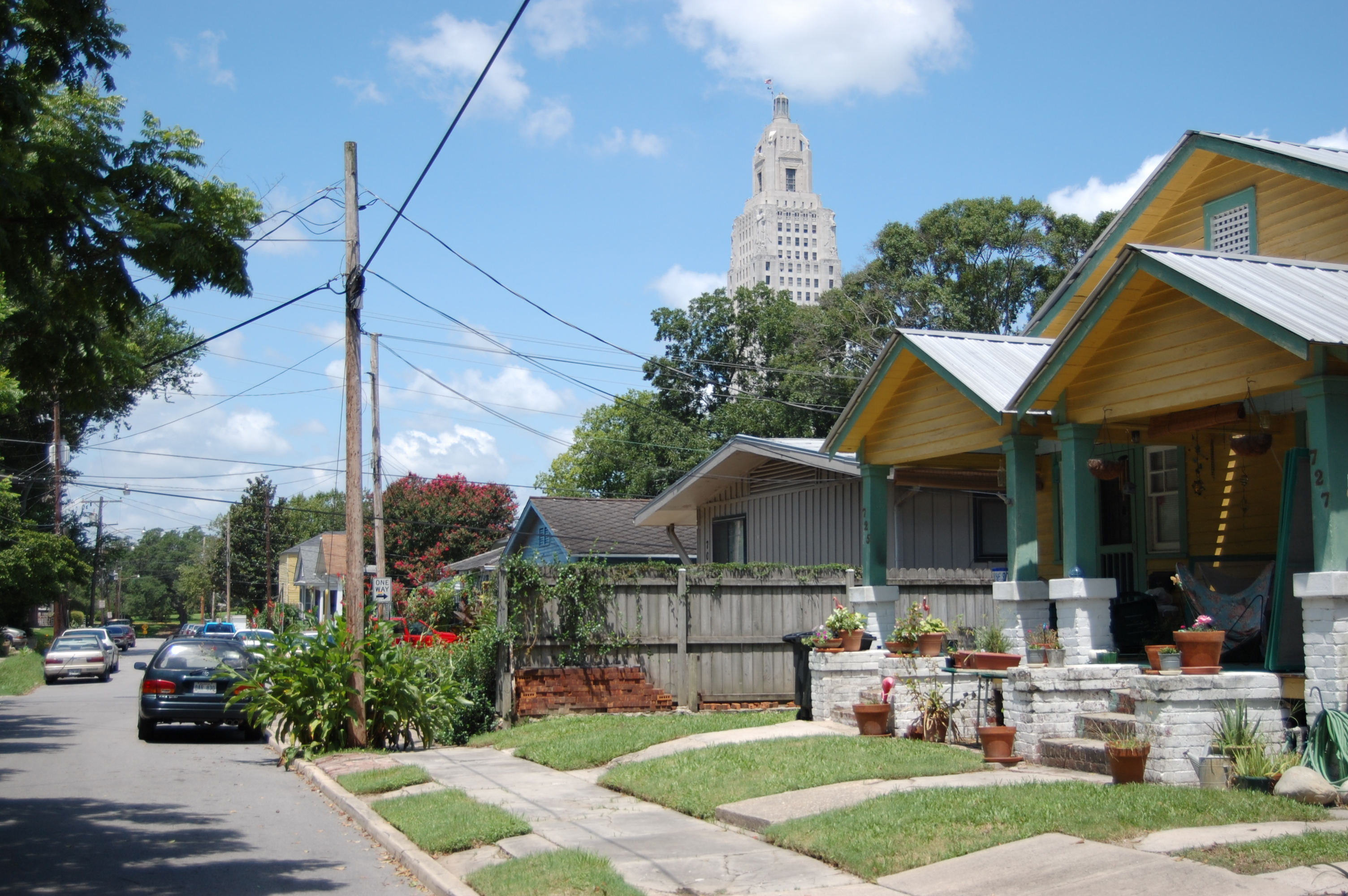
Lakeland Drive in Spanish Town, with the Louisiana State Capitol

Spanish Town (Spanish: Ciudad española) is a historic district anchored by Spanish Town Road in Baton Rouge, the capital city of the U.S. state of Louisiana. It is well known for its annual Mardi Gras parade, which is the largest in Baton Rouge.

Spanish Town was commissioned in 1805. It is the oldest neighborhood in Baton Rouge, and its 49.4 acres (20.0 ha) area, comprising 258 contributing properties, was added to the National Register of Historic Places on August 31, 1978. The area has gone through many developmental changes, and its surviving structures range in date from 1823 to 1975. The oldest structure is the Pino House (built 1823). The individually listed Potts House and Stewart-Dougherty House are also part of the historic district since the time of its creation.

The area is home to a variety of people from many different social classes. Spanish Town was at one time particularly renowned for possessing a higher-than-average proportion of gay residents, though this has waned over the years with urban gentrification.

== History of Spanish Town, Baton Rouge ==
The first plans appeared at 11 December 1804 by surveyor Vicente S. Criado, for 14 families at 350 toises (700 m) from Fort San Carlos by request of the governor of the district.

The neighborhood of Spanish Town was commissioned in 1805 by Don Carlos de Grand Pré. According to the Baton Rouge State Times (Oct. 18, 1980), "When Galvez Town, twenty miles southeast of Baton Rouge, was ceded in the Louisiana Purchase to the United States in 1803, the Canary Islanders who lived there asked to come to Baton Rouge in order to continue living on Spanish soil. In 1805, Carlos de Grand Pré (Charles Grandpre), administrator of the Baton Rouge District, drew up the layout of an area east of the fort 'out of cannon shot' that became known as Spanish Town."

Much of Spanish West Florida, though part of New Spain after about 1780, was actually inhabited by people of English descent, who disliked being under Spanish rule. The city of Baton Rouge was a mainly Anglo area, but the settling of Spanish Town allowed the Spanish citizens a place for their culture and language to thrive.

The American Civil War brought destruction to the area and left only a few homes and buildings standing, and the area was mostly abandoned. In the years following the Civil War, Spanish Town was mostly populated by African Americans, many of them freed slaves looking for work in Baton Rouge. Homes and churches were built, and the neighborhood grew busier.

The founding of Louisiana State University had an influence on the area, which, between 1890 and 1920, grew to inhabit and cater to students and faculty of the university.

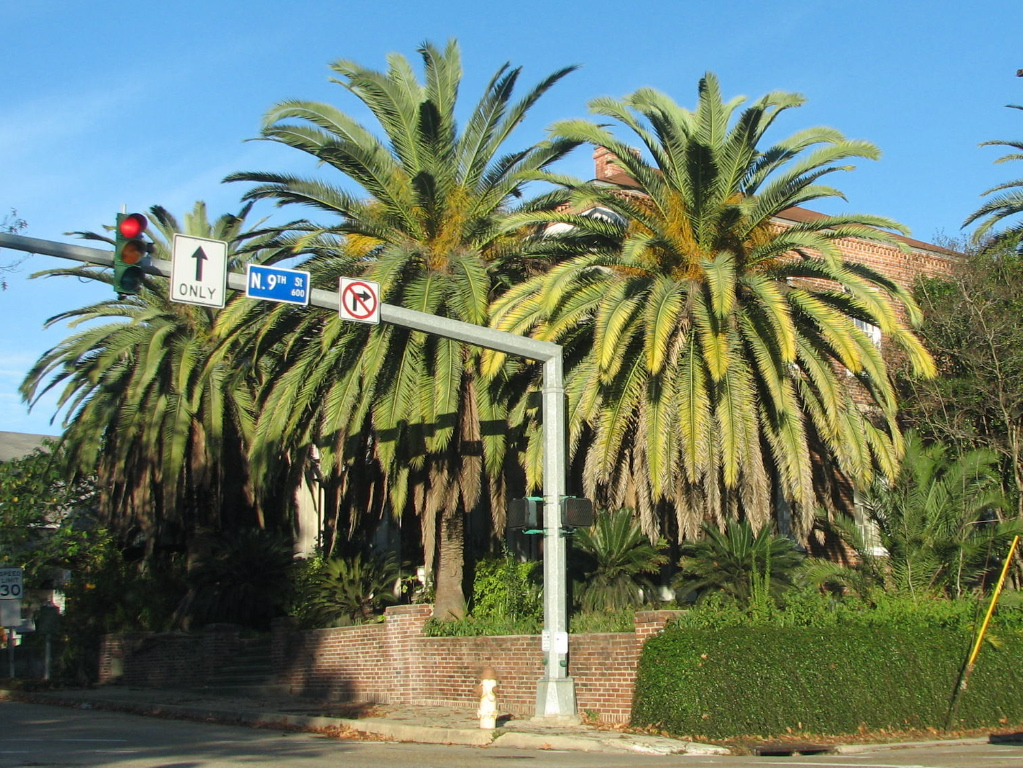
Potts House at 831 North Street

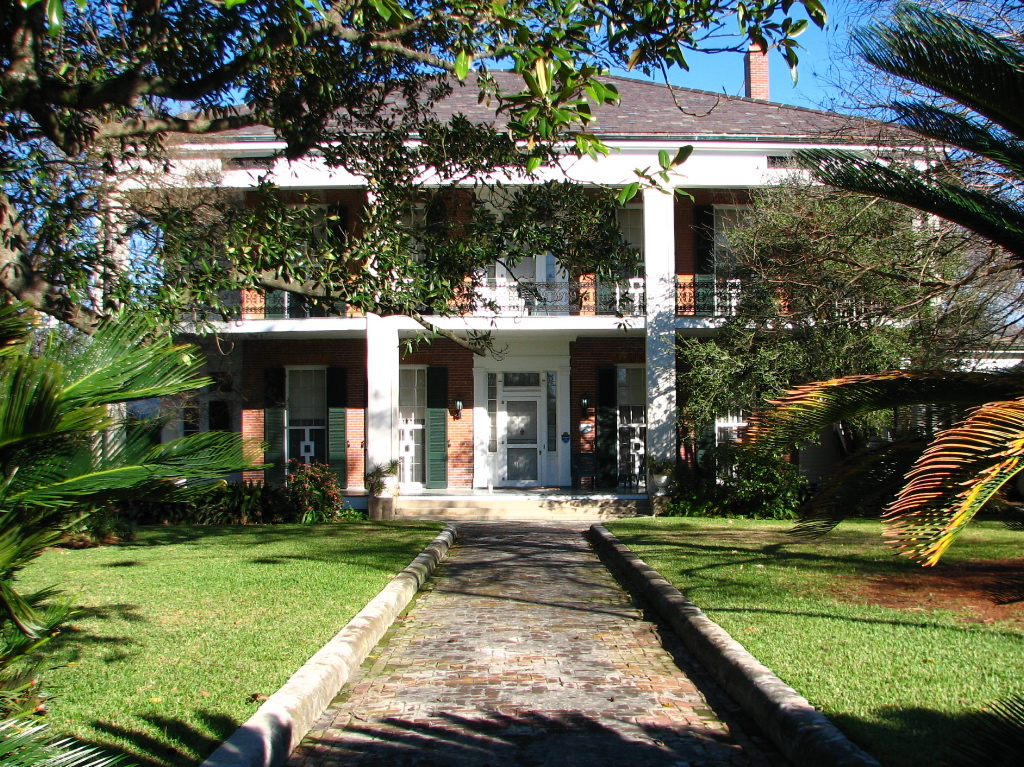
Stewart-Dougherty House at 741 North Street

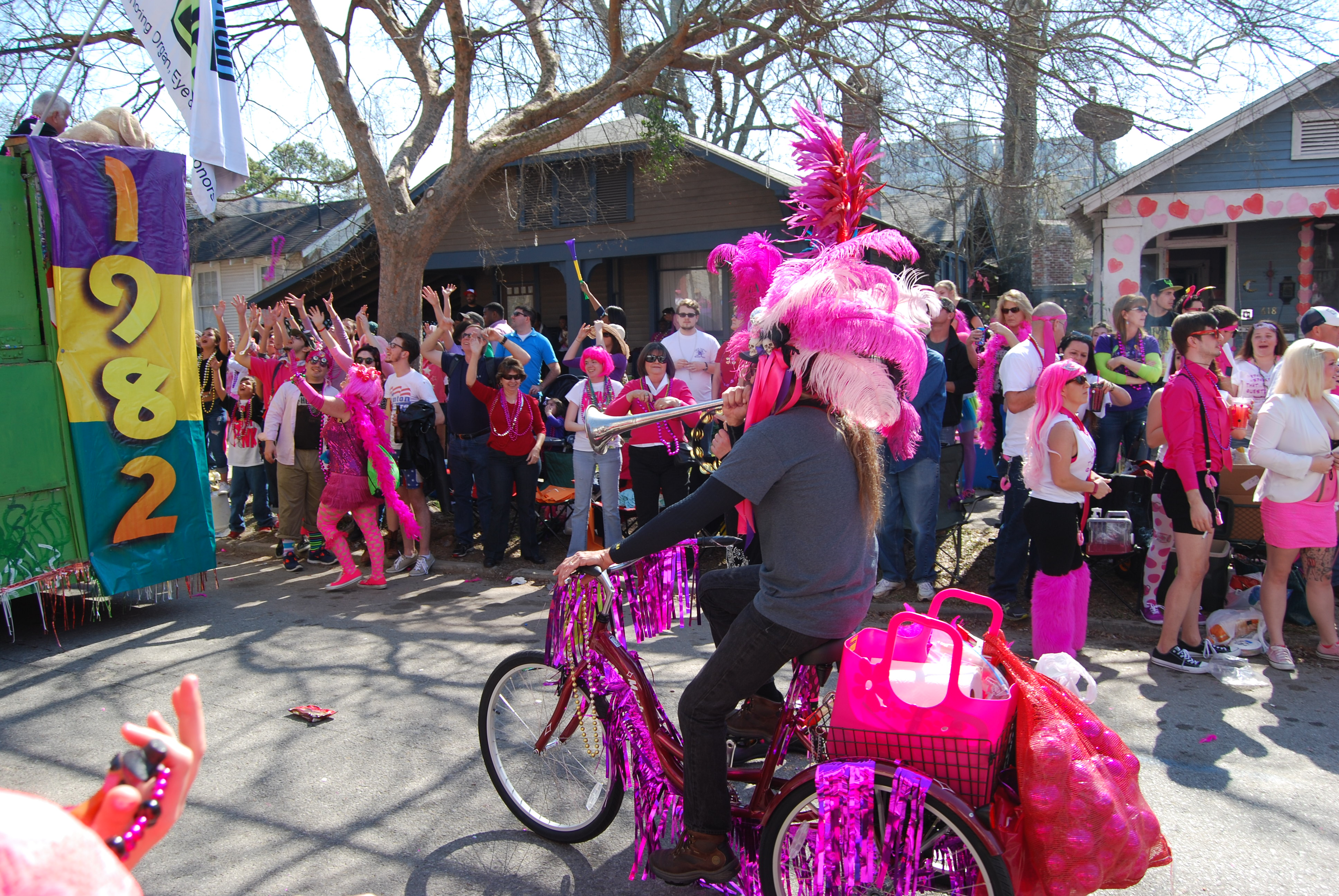
People celebrate Spanish Town Mardi Gras, 2015

== Spanish Town Mardi Gras ==
Spanish Town is the site of Baton Rouge's largest Mardi Gras parade, which is celebrated annually on the Saturday before Mardi Gras. The first Spanish Town Mardi Gras parade took place in 1981, as a way for residents to "celebrate their difference". Apparently this first parade was very small, and consisted of a few children on foot who played instruments and threw trinkets to the crowd. It has since grown to include elaborate floats, and has adopted a very sarcastic and raunchy tone; it is not considered "family friendly". Each year has a different theme. The floats typically tend to offer crude political commentary, usually about local and national power figures. There are Krewes, as are seen in the traditional New Orleans Mardi Gras parades, but they are more informal than those, as demonstrated by their humorous names such as "Krewe of Roadkill" and "Wasted Krewe". The unofficial mascot of the parade, which has since become that of the entire neighborhood of Spanish Town, is the pink flamingo.

== Pink flamingo ==
As a mascot, the pink flamingo is said to represent the saying "poor taste is better than no taste at all", which became somewhat of a mantra for the Spanish Town neighborhood as it grew to include more eccentric residents. There is a tradition in Baton Rouge involving pink flamingos that originates from the celebration of Spanish Town Mardi Gras. Around the beginning of the Mardi Gras season, approximately two dozen large pink flamingos made of plywood are placed in the LSU Lakes, adjacent to LSU, to announce that the date for the annual Mardi Gras ball has been announced. It is a tradition to "kidnap" one of these flamingos, usually by taking a boat out on the lake, and use it as a yard or home decoration. There is a unique sense of pride associated in having acquired one of these special flamingos.

== See also ==
- National Register of Historic Places listings in East Baton Rouge Parish, Louisiana
