= Galveston (disambiguation) =

Galveston is a city in the U.S. state of Texas.

Galveston may also refer to:

== Places in the United States ==
- Galveston Bay, a large estuary located along Texas's upper coast
- Galveston Bay Area, a loosely defined region in the southeast portion of Greater Houston
- Galveston Causeway, a bridge in Galveston, Texas
- Galveston County, a county located along the Gulf Coast region in the U.S. state of Texas
- Galveston, Indiana, a town located in the state of Indiana
- Galveston Island, a barrier island on the Texas Gulf coast in the United States, about 50 miles (80 km) southeast of Houston
- Galveston, Virginia, unincorporated community in Pittsylvania County in the state of Virginia

== Arts, entertainment, and media ==
=== Literature ===
- Galveston (Quarrington novel), a 2004 novel by Paul Quarrington
- Galveston, a novel by Nic Pizzolatto
- Galveston, a World Fantasy Award-winning novel by Sean Stewart

=== Music ===
- Galveston (album), a 1969 album by Glen Campbell
- "Galveston" (song), a song released in 1969 by Glen Campbell
- "Galveston", a song by Janis Ian from the 1969 album Who Really Cares

=== Other arts, entertainment, and media ===
- Galveston (film), a 2018 film directed by Mélanie Laurent
- The Galveston Empire, the main antagonist in the Japanese anime series Armored Fleet Dairugger XV

== Transportation and craft ==
- Galveston–Houston Electric Railway
- Galveston-class cruiser, a Navy ship used during World War II

== Other uses ==
- Galveston College, a comprehensive community college located on Galveston Island in Galveston, Texas

== See also ==
- Galveztown (disambiguation)
