= Galveston, Virginia =

Unincorporated community in Virginia, US

Coordinates: 36°55′12″N 79°23′00″W

Galveston is an unincorporated community in Pittsylvania County, in the U.S. state of Virginia.
