= USS Morris (1778) =

History

United States
- Name: USS Morris
- Namesake: Robert Morris
- Acquired: 1778
- Fate: Wrecked 18 August 1779
- Notes: Formerly Rebecca

General characteristics
- Type: Frigate
- Propulsion: Sails
- Complement: 150
- Armament: 24 guns

USS Morris was a 24-gun frigate of the Continental Navy in commission from 1778 to 1779. She was named for Founding Father, Continental Congressman, and a major financier of the American Revolution, Robert Morris.

During the American Revolutionary War a party twenty-nine men of the 13th Virginia Regiment led by James Willing departed Fort Pitt and traveled down the Mississippi river where they captured the British ship Rebecca moored at Fort Bute. Oliver Pollock, the American commercial agent at New Orleans who had charge of naval affairs on the Mississippi during the American Revolution, purchased Rebecca for the Continental Congress. The ship was renamed Morris and was manned and converted to a Man-of-war under the command of Captain William Pickles.

A severe hurricane destroyed Morris on 18 August 1779, causing the loss of 11 of her crew.
