= Galveztown, Louisiana =

Galveztown Villa de Gálvez (Spanish)
- Ghost town
- Official plan for Galveztown.

- Location within Louisiana Location within the United States
- Coordinates: 30°20′31″N 90°53′20″W
- Country: United States
- State: Louisiana
- Parish: Ascension Parish
- MCD: Parish Governing Authority District 5
- Historic colonies: Louisiana (New Spain); Louisiana (New France)
- Established: November 22, 1778
- Abandoned: 1810
- Named after: Bernardo de Gálvez
- Elevation: 16 ft (4.9 m)
- Time zone: UTC−6 (Central)
  - Summer (DST): UTC−5 (Central)
- ZIP code: 70769
- Area code: 225
- GNIS feature ID: 540630

Galveztown (/ˈɡælvɛztaʊn/), or Villa de Gálvez (Spanish: [ˈbiʝa ðe ˈɣalβes]), is a ghost town located at the confluence of Bayou Manchac and the Amite River in Ascension Parish, Louisiana. Galveztown was established in 1778 with the settlement of Canary Islanders colonists and Anglo-Americans fleeing the American Revolutionary War. Due to deplorable conditions and disease, the settlement was eventually abandoned and many residents fled to Spanish Town in 1806. Some former residents remained in the area and established the community of Gálvez, Louisiana during the first half of the nineteenth century.

== History ==
In 1778, Loyalists from the settlement of Canewood in British West Florida relocated to the south bank of the Amite River after fleeing American Revolutionaries. In November of the same year, the first ship of several carrying Canary Islanders, or Isleños, would reach Louisiana to help defend the territory against a possible British invasion. Spanish Governor Bernardo de Gálvez traveled up the Mississippi River on November 12 or 13 with the recent Isleño arrivals in search of a proper location to establish a settlement. On November 22, Gálvez reached the point at which the Amite River and Bayou Manchac met and came across the fledgling Anglo-American settlement joined by French and German inhabitants. Gálvez granted asylum to those in the settlement under the requirement that the Isleños may be settled at the site as well as that a Spanish fort and garrison may be constructed. The inhabitants agreed and named their settlement "Villa de Gálvez" or "Galveztown" in honor of Governor Gálvez.

=== American Revolutionary War ===
Almost from the very beginning, Galveztown was beset by tragedy. Diseases such as smallpox and scabies took the lives of various community members. Medical assistance was soon sent by Governor Gálvez but other diseases and maladies continued to beleaguer the community. Despite this, the militiamen of Galveztown managed to capture the British outpost of Amite along with 7 vessels and 125 soldiers and sailors in August, 1779. At the same time, Gálvez traveled up the Mississippi River and captured the British forts of Brute (Manchac), Baton Rouge, and Natchez. Following the capture of Mobile in 1780, Galveztown lost much of its strategic military importance.

Just as in the year prior, smallpox and other diseases continued to ravage the Galveztown. By the winter of 1780, over one-third of Isleños that arrived to the community were dead. On August 24, 1780, a powerful hurricane struck Louisiana which destroyed much of the community and its crops. Much of the community lived in poverty and lacked adequate food or clothing. It was not until the end of the American Revolutionary War that the community saw a small increase in its population.

=== Decline ===
By the beginning of 1786, more than half of the houses in Galveztown had been abandoned and fallen into disrepair. A number of residents petitioned Governor Miró for permission to leave the community with many wishing to go to the Isleño community of San Bernardo. In 1794, a series of hurricanes flooded and destroyed homes and spoiled crops. This was immediately followed by the flooding of the Amite River which affected every single family of Galveztown.

In the face of repeated flooding of the Amite River coupled with the destruction dealt by hurricanes, the residents continued to rebuild and eke out an existence. With the Louisiana Purchase, many of the Isleños chose to abandon the settlement. Many of them wished to remain within Spanish territory and so they fled primarily to Baton Rouge and established the neighborhood of Spanish Town. The last marriage to take place in Galveztown was in February, 1807. Other residents remained in the vicinity and eventually established the community of Gálvez on higher ground.

=== Preservation and study ===
In 1962, a state historical marker was placed at the site of Galveztown by the Louisiana Department of Commerce and Industry.

Since 1980, the former site of Galveztown has undergone archaeological work by various groups. Recent work has been able to uncover a collection of artifacts from the community as well as hypothesize the locations of certain buildings. Classes have been offered through Louisiana State University which allow students to study the location.

== Current settlement ==
Galvez Town is a populated area within Prairieville, Louisiana, that is situated around the former location of Galveztown.
