= Battle of Fort Charlotte =

1780 battle of the American Revolutionary War

- Part of the Gulf Coast campaign
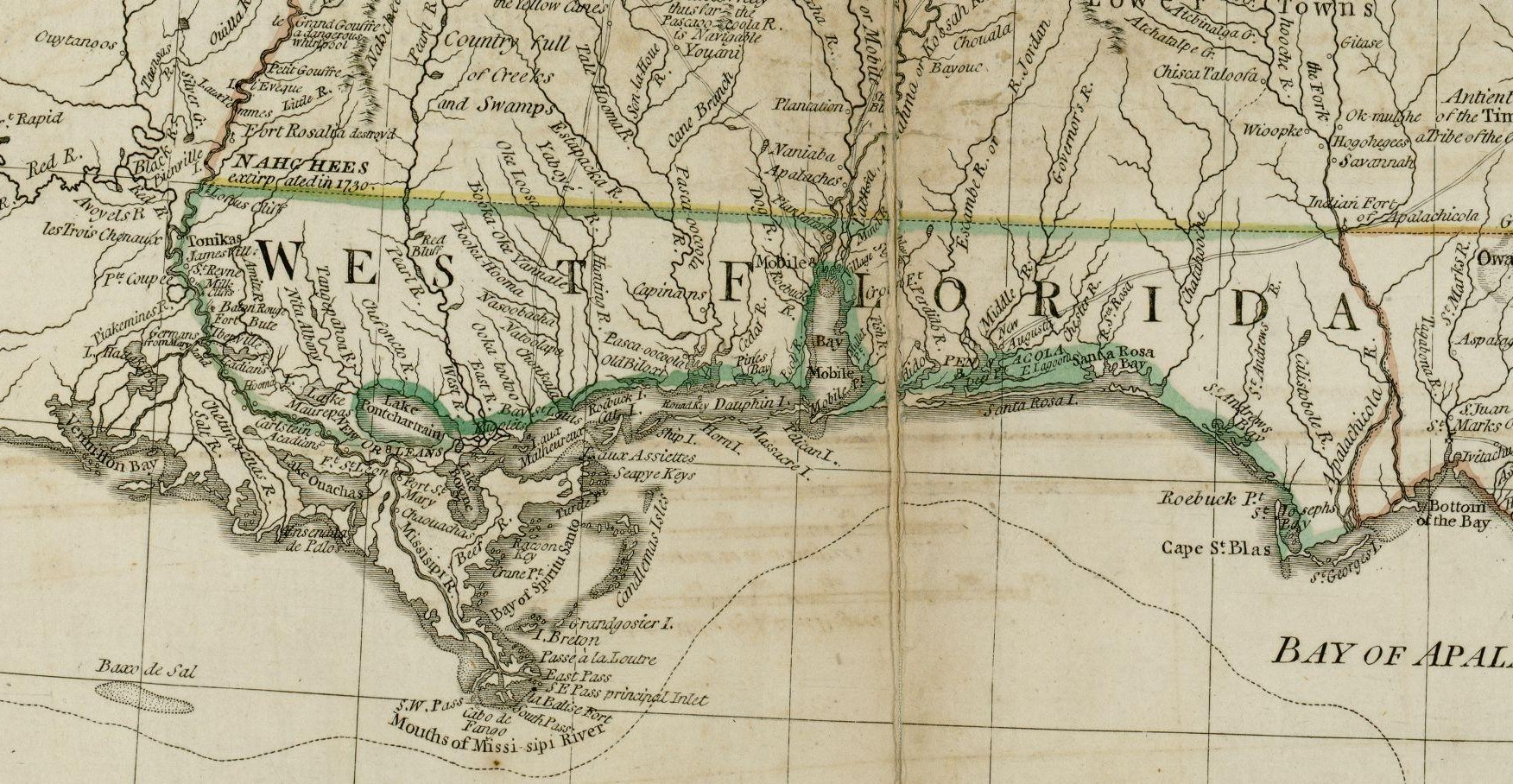
- Detail from a 1776 map showing West Florida
Date	March 2–14, 1780
Location	Fort Charlotte, West Florida (present-day Mobile, Alabama) 30°41′10.03″N 88°2′29.42″W
Result	Spanish victory

Belligerents
Spain	Great Britain

Commanders and leaders
(Spanish Empire) Bernardo de Gálvez	(Kingdom of Great Britain) Elias Durnford (POW)

Strength
7,500 regulars and militia (most from Cuban expedition)	3,500 regulars and militia

Casualties and losses
272	1,320
- Location within North America

The Battle of Fort Charlotte, also known as the siege of Fort Charlotte, was a two-week siege conducted by Spanish general Bernardo de Gálvez against the British fortifications guarding the port of Mobile, (which was then in the British province of West Florida, and now in Alabama) during the Anglo-Spanish War of 1779-1783. Fort Charlotte was the last remaining British frontier post capable of threatening New Orleans, Louisiana. Its fall drove the British from the western reaches of West Florida and reduced the British military presence in West Florida to its capital, Pensacola.

Gálvez's army sailed from New Orleans aboard a small fleet of transports on January 28, 1780. On February 25, the Spaniards landed near Fort Charlotte. The outnumbered British garrison resisted stubbornly until Spanish bombardment breached the walls. The garrison commander, Captain Elias Durnford, had waited in vain for relief from Pensacola, but was forced to surrender. Their capitulation secured the western shore of Mobile Bay and opened the way for Spanish operations against Pensacola.

== Background ==
When Spain entered the American Revolutionary War in 1779, Bernardo de Gálvez, the energetic governor of Louisiana, immediately began offensive operations. In September 1779 he gained complete control over the lower Mississippi River by capturing Fort Bute and then shortly thereafter obtaining the surrender of the remaining British forces on the river following the Battle of Baton Rouge. Following these successes, he began planning operations against Mobile and Pensacola, the remaining British presence in the province of West Florida.

== Spanish forces ==
Gálvez assembled a mixed force of Spanish regulars and militia in New Orleans. While he had requested additional troops from Havana for operations against Mobile and Pensacola in 1779, his requests had been rejected. Before departing New Orleans, he dispatched one of his lieutenants to Havana to make one last request. On January 11, 1780, a fleet of twelve ships carrying 754 men set sail, reaching the mouth of the Mississippi on January 18. They were joined on January 20 by the Gálveztown (brig sloop), under the command of Captain William Pickles and with a crew of 58. On February 6, a storm scattered the fleet. In spite of this, all ships arrived outside Mobile Bay by February 9. The fleet encountered significant problems actually getting into the bay. Several ships ran aground on sand bars, and at least one, the Volante, was wrecked as a result. Gálvez salvaged guns from the wreck and set them up on Mobile Point to guard the bay entrance.

On February 20, reinforcements arrived from Havana, bringing the force to about 1,200 men. By February 25, the Spanish had landed their army on the shores of the Dog River, about 10 miles (16 km) from Fort Charlotte. They were informed by a deserter that the fort was garrisoned by 300 men.

== British defenses ==
Fort Charlotte was built in 1717 by the French as Fort Condé when Mobile was part of the French province of Louisiana (New France). By 1763, when the British took over following the French and Indian War, the fort was in ruins. While it was repaired at that time, by the time hostilities with Spain neared in 1779, it was again in disrepair. The garrison's regulars were primarily from the 60th regiment, and were augmented by Loyalists from Maryland and Pennsylvania, as well as local volunteers, in total about 300 men. Ever since news of Gálvez' successes had reached Mobile, Durnford had been directing improvements to the fort's defenses.

== Siege ==
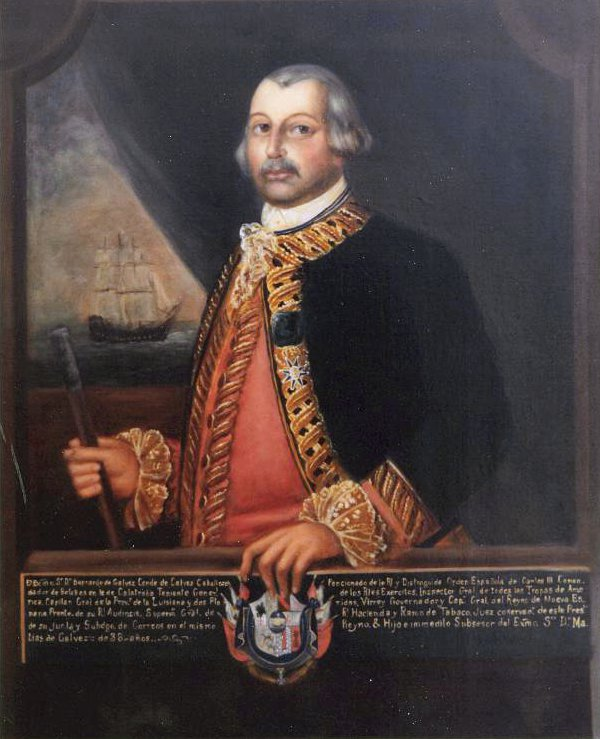
Bernardo de Gálvez

On March 1, Gálvez sent Lt. Col. Francisco Bouligny to deliver a letter to Durnford offering to accept his surrender, which was politely rejected. Gálvez began setting up gun batteries around the fort the next day. Durnford wrote to General John Campbell at Pensacola requesting reinforcements. On March 5 and 6, most of the Pensacola garrison left on a march toward Mobile. Delayed by difficult river crossings, this force was unable to assist the Fort Charlotte garrison.

While the Spanish engaged in siege operations to move their guns nearer the fort, Gálvez and Durnford engaged in a courteous written dialogue. For example, Gálvez politely criticized Durnford for burning some houses in order to deny the cover they provided to the Spaniards. Durnford responded by pointing out that the other side of the fort (away from most of the town) offered a better vantage point for attack. All the while, the Spanish continued to dig trenches and bombard the fort. On March 13, the walls of Fort Charlotte were breached, and Durnford capitulated the next day, surrendering his garrison.

== Aftermath ==
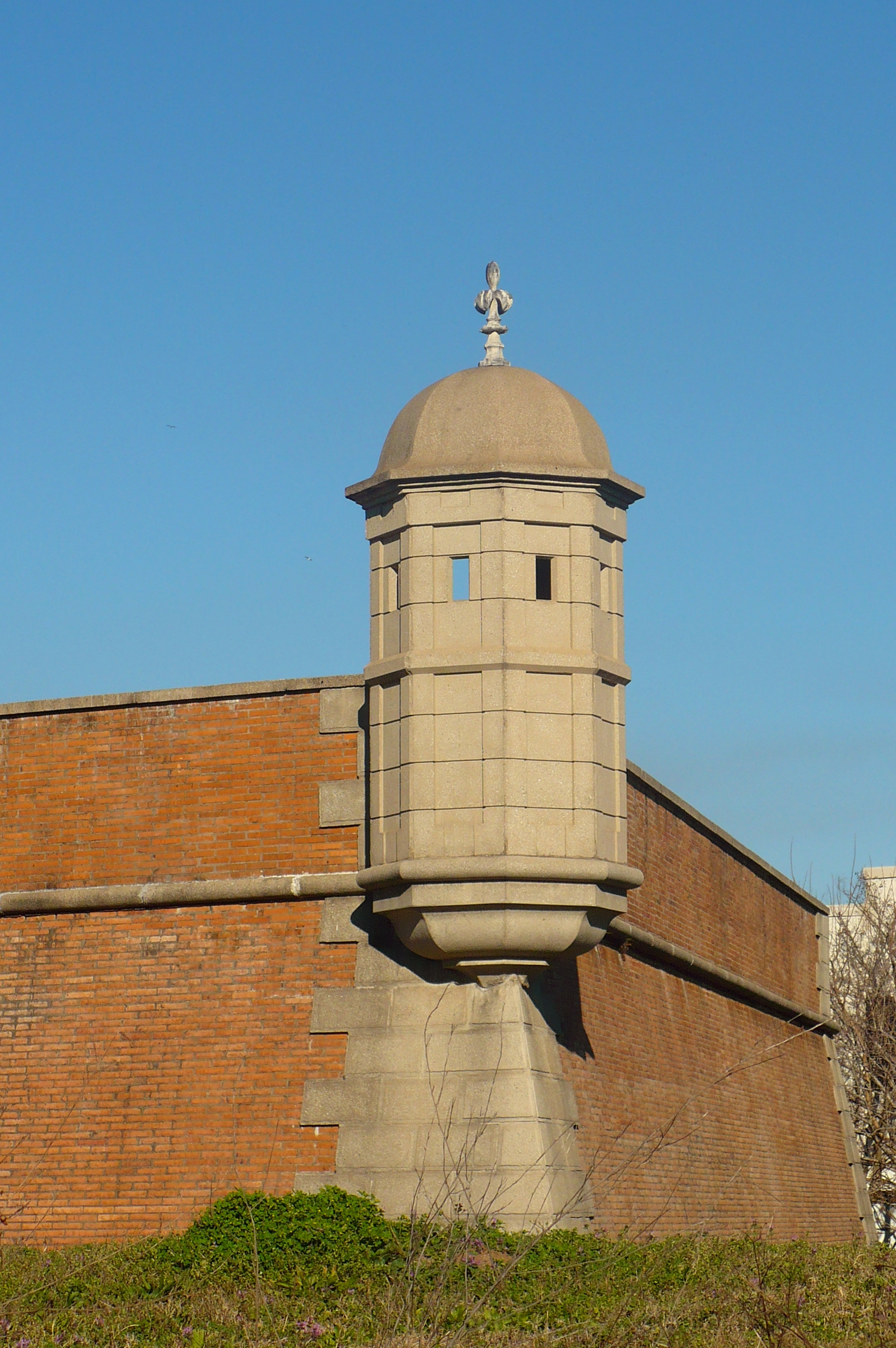
Bastion of the reconstructed fort.

Gálvez did not immediately move against Pensacola after his victory at Fort Charlotte, although he wanted to take advantage of the British disorganization caused by the attempt to support Mobile. However, since he knew that Pensacola was strongly defended, and armed with powerful cannons, he again requested large-scale naval support from Havana. He learned in April that additional reinforcements, including British Royal Navy vessels, had arrived at Pensacola. Without reinforcements, he left a garrison in Mobile, and left for Havana to raise the troops and equipment needed for an attack on Pensacola.

Gálvez did not actually launch his successful attack on Pensacola until 1781, and then only after the garrison at Mobile fended off a counterattack by the British in January 1781.

Fort Charlotte was razed in the 19th century. In the late 20th century its foundations were rediscovered and a reduced size replica was constructed on its site. The fort is listed on the National Register of Historic Places.

== See also ==
- American Revolutionary War § Mississippi River theater. Places ' Battle of Fort Charlotte ' in overall sequence and strategic context.

== Bibliography ==
- Badger, Reid; Clayton, Lawrence A (2003). Alabama and the Borderlands: From Prehistory To Statehood. University, AL: University of Alabama Press. ISBN 978-0-8173-1277-0. OCLC 9944540.
- Chávez, Thomas E (2004). Spain and the Independence of the United States: An Intrinsic Gift. Albuquerque, NM: UNM Press. ISBN 978-0-8263-2794-9. OCLC 149117944.
- Dupuy, R. Ernest; Hammerman, Gay; Hayes, Grace P (1977). The American Revolution: A Global War. New York: David McKay. ISBN 0-679-50648-9.
- Hamilton, Peter Joseph (1897). Colonial Mobile. Houghton Mifflin. OCLC 9296191.
