= Bernardo de Gálvez =

Spanish colonial administrator (1746–1786)

The Most Excellent Field Marshal Bernardo de Gálvez 1st Count of Gálvez
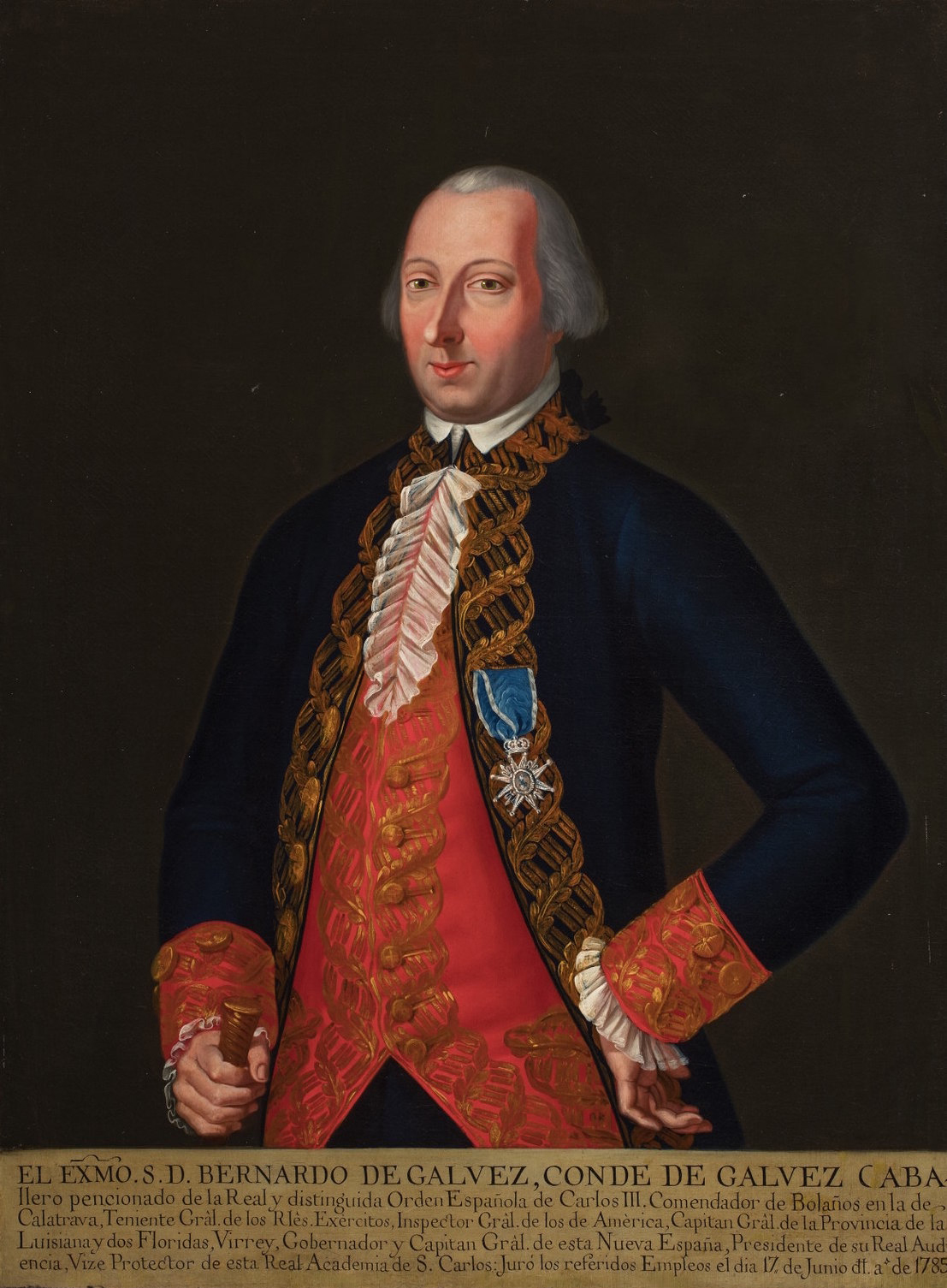
- Portrait by José Germán de Alfaro, 1785

49th Viceroy of New Spain
- In office 18 June 1785 – 30 July 1786
- Monarch: Charles III
- First Secretary of State: Count of Floridablanca
- Secretary of State for the Indies: José de Gálvez
- Preceded by: Matías de Gálvez
- Succeeded by: Alonso Núñez de Haro y Peralta

66th Governor of Cuba
- Interim; 4 February – 7 April 1785
- Monarch: Charles III
- First Secretary of State: Count of Floridablanca
- Secretary of State for the Indies: José de Gálvez
- Viceroy of New Spain: Vicente de Herrera y Rivero
- Preceded by: Luis de Unzaga
- Succeeded by: Bernardo Troncoso Martínez del Rincón

27th Governor of Bahamas
- In office 8 May 1782 – 19 April 1783
- Monarch: Charles III
- First Secretary of State: Count of Floridablanca
- Secretary of State for the Indies: José de Gálvez
- Viceroy of New Spain: Martín de Mayorga
- Preceded by: John Robert Maxwell
- Succeeded by: Andrew Deveaux

Governor and Captain General of West Florida
- In office 12 November 1781 – 14 July 1785
- Monarch: Charles III
- First Secretary of State: Count of Floridablanca
- Secretary of State for the Indies: José de Gálvez
- Viceroy of New Spain: Martín de Mayorga; Matías de Gálvez; Vicente de Herrera y Rivero; Himself
- Governor of Cuba: Diego José Navarro García de Valladares; Juan Manuel Cagigal y Monserrat; Luis de Unzaga; Himself; Bernardo Troncoso Martínez del Rincón
- Governor of Louisiana: Himself
- Preceded by: Military position created
- Succeeded by: Esteban Rodríguez Miró

5th Spanish Governor of Louisiana
- In office 1 April 1777 – 14 July 1785
- Monarch: Charles III
- First Secretary of State: Count of Floridablanca
- Secretary of State for the Indies: José de Gálvez
- Viceroy of New Spain: Antonio María de Bucareli; Francisco Romá y Rosell; Martín de Mayorga; Matías de Gálvez; Vicente de Herrera y Rivero; Himself
- Governor of Cuba: Felipe de Fondesviela; Diego José Navarro García de Valladares; Juan Manuel Cagigal y Monserrat; Luis de Unzaga; Himself; Bernardo Troncoso Martínez del Rincón
- Preceded by: Luis de Unzaga
- Succeeded by: Esteban Rodríguez Miró

Personal details
- Born: Bernardo de Gálvez y Madrid; 23 July 1746 Macharaviaya, Spain
- Died: 30 November 1786 (aged 40) Tacubaya District, Mexico City, New Spain, Spanish Empire
- Spouse: Marie-Félicité de Saint-Maxent d'Estrehan (m. 1777)
- Relations: José de Gálvez (uncle); Antonio de Gálvez y Gallardo (uncle); Miguel de Gálvez y Gallardo (uncle); María Rosa de Gálvez (cousin)
- Children: Miguel de Gálvez y Saint-Maxent
- Parent(s): Matías de Gálvez (father); María Josefa de Madrid (mother)
- Awards: Order of Charles III; Honorary U.S. Citizenship

Military service
- Allegiance: Spain
- Branch/service: Spanish Army
- Years of service: 1762–1786
- Rank: Captain General; Field Marshal
- Battles/wars: Spanish Invasion of Portugal; Invasion of Algiers; American Revolutionary War; Capture of Fort Bute; Battle of Baton Rouge; Battle of Fort Charlotte; Siege of Pensacola (WIA)

Bernardo Vicente de Gálvez y Madrid, 1st Count of Gálvez (23 July 1746 – 30 November 1786) was a Spanish military leader and government official who served as colonial governor of Spanish Louisiana and Cuba, and later as Viceroy of New Spain.

A career soldier since the age of 16, Gálvez was a veteran of several wars across Europe, the Americas, and North Africa. While governor of Louisiana, under the orders of the Spanish Crown he supported the colonists and their French allies in the American Revolutionary War, helping facilitate vital supply lines and frustrate British operations in the Gulf Coast. Under Gálvez's command, Spanish troops achieved several victories on the battlefield, most notably conquering West Florida and eliminating the British naval presence in the Gulf. This campaign led to the formal return of all of Florida to Spain in the Treaty of Paris, which he played a role in drafting.

Gálvez's actions aided the American war effort and made him a hero to both Spain and the newly independent United States. The U.S. Congress endeavored to hang his portrait in the Capitol, finally doing so in 2014. He was granted many titles and honors by the Spanish government, which in 1783 appointed him viceroy of one of its most valuable territories, New Spain, succeeding his father Matías de Gálvez y Gallardo. He served until his death from typhus.

While somewhat forgotten in the United States, Gálvez remains in high esteem among many Americans, particularly in the southern and western states that once formed part of Spain's North American territory. Gálvez Day is celebrated as a local holiday in Pensacola, and several places bear his name, including Galveston, Texas and Galvez, Louisiana. In 2014, Gálvez became one of only eight people to have been awarded honorary U.S. citizenship.

== Origins and military career ==
Bernardo de Gálvez was born in Macharaviaya, a mountain village in the province of Málaga, Spain, on 23 July 1746. He was the son of Matías de Gálvez and his wife María Josefa de Madrid, who died when Bernardo was only 2 years old. He studied military sciences at the Academia de Ávila and at the age of 16 participated in the Spanish invasion of Portugal, which stalled after the Spanish had captured Almeida. Following the conflict he was promoted to infantry lieutenant. He arrived at the Viceroyalty of New Spain (present day Mexico plus several U.S. states) in 1769. As a captain, he fought the Apaches, with his Opata Indian allies. He received many wounds, several of them serious. In 1770, he was promoted to commandant of arms of Nueva Vizcaya and Sonora, northern provinces of New Spain.

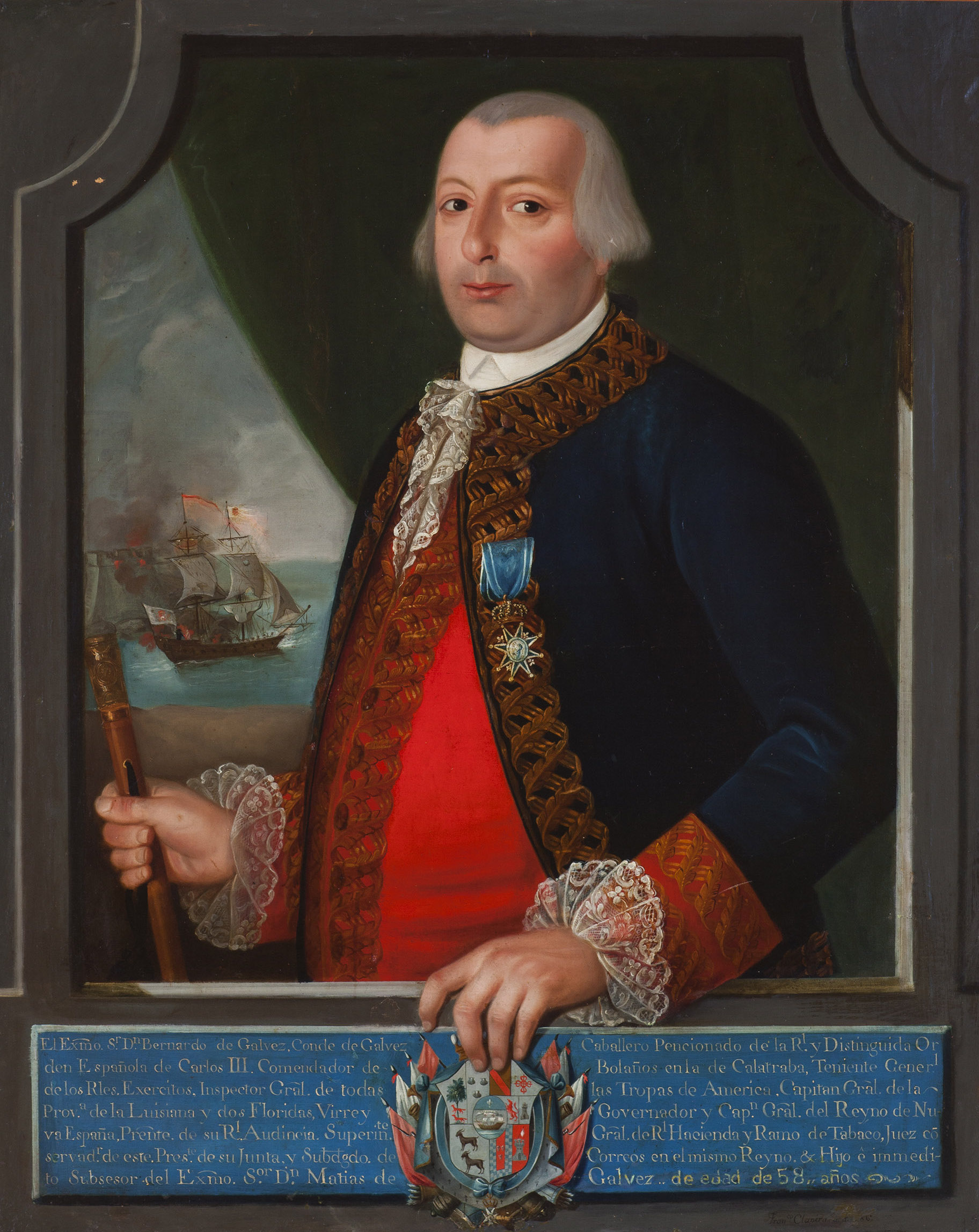
Portrayed as viceroy of New Spain, c. 1785

In 1772, Gálvez returned to Peninsular Spain with his uncle, José de Gálvez. Later, he was sent to Pau, France, where he served with the Royal Cantabria regiment, an elite Franco-Spanish unit, for three years. There, he learned to speak French, which would serve him well when he became governor of Louisiana. Gálvez was transferred to Seville in 1775, and then participated in Alejandro O'Reilly's disastrous expedition to Algiers, where he was seriously wounded during the Spanish assault on the fortress that guarded the city. Afterward he was appointed a professor at the military academy of Ávila and promoted to lieutenant colonel; he was made colonel in 1776.

== Spanish governor of Louisiana ==
On 1 January 1777, Bernardo de Gálvez became the new governor of the formerly French province of Louisiana, ceded to Spain in 1762 as compensation for the loss of Florida to Britain, after Spain was urged to enter the Seven Years' War on the French side.

In November 1777, Gálvez married Marie-Félicité de Saint-Maxent d'Estrehan, the Creole daughter of the French-born Gilbert Antoine de Saint-Maxent and the Creole Elizabeth La Roche, and young widow of Jean Baptiste Honoré d'Estrehan, the son of a high ranking French colonial official. This marriage to the daughter of a Frenchman won Gálvez the favor of the local Creole population. They had three children, Miguel, Matilde, and Guadalupe Felicitas.

As governor, Gálvez enacted an anti-British policy, taking measures against British smuggling and promoting trade with France. He damaged British interests in the region and kept it open for supplies to reach George Washington's army during the American Revolutionary War. He founded Galvez Town in 1779, promoted the colonization of Nueva Iberia, and established free trade with Cuba and Yucatán. Galvez Street in New Orleans is named for him. In 1779, Gálvez was promoted to brigadier.

== American Revolutionary War ==
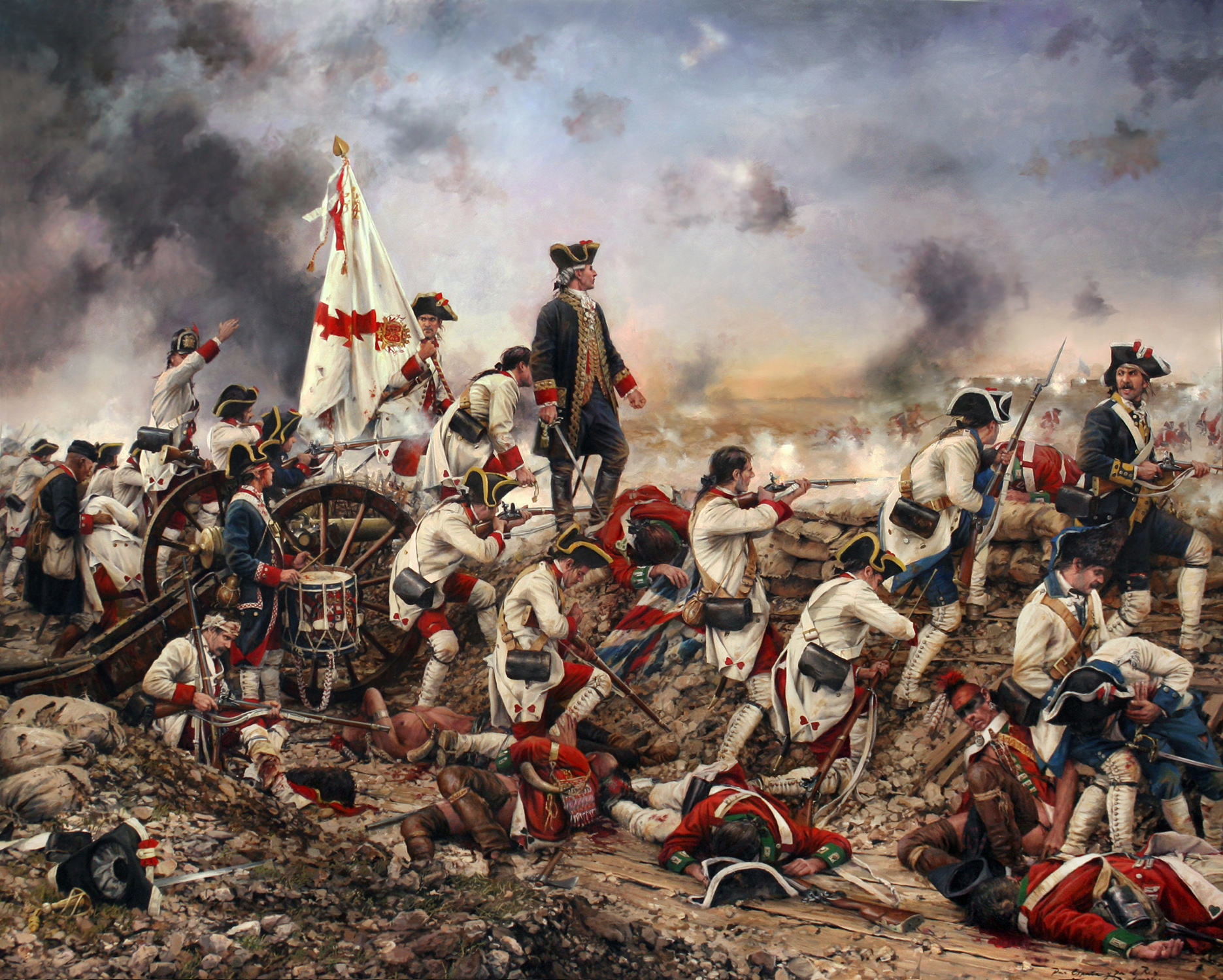
Painting of Gálvez at the siege of Pensacola by Augusto Ferrer-Dalmau

In December 1776, King Charles III of Spain decided that covert assistance to the United States would be strategically useful, but Spain did not enter into a formal alliance with the U.S. In 1777, José de Gálvez, newly appointed as minister of the Council of the Indies, sent his nephew, Bernardo de Gálvez, to New Orleans as governor of Luisiana with instructions to secure the friendship of the United States. On 20 February 1777, the Spanish king's ministers in Madrid secretly instructed Gálvez to sell the Americans desperately needed supplies. The British had blockaded the colonial ports of the Thirteen Colonies, and consequently the route from New Orleans up the Mississippi River was an effective alternative. Gálvez worked with Oliver Pollock, an American patriot, to ship gunpowder, muskets, uniforms, medicine, and other supplies to the American colonial rebels. On October 31, 1778, the Continental Congress issued a resolution thanking de Gálvez for his "spirited and disinterested conduct towards these states".

Although Spain had not yet joined openly the American cause, when an American raiding expedition led by James Willing showed up in New Orleans with booty and several captured British ships taken as prizes, Gálvez refused to turn the Americans over to the British. In 1779, Spanish forces commanded by Gálvez seized the province of West Florida, later known as the Florida Parishes, from the British. Spain's motive was the chance both to recover territories lost to the British, particularly Florida, and to remove the ongoing British threat.

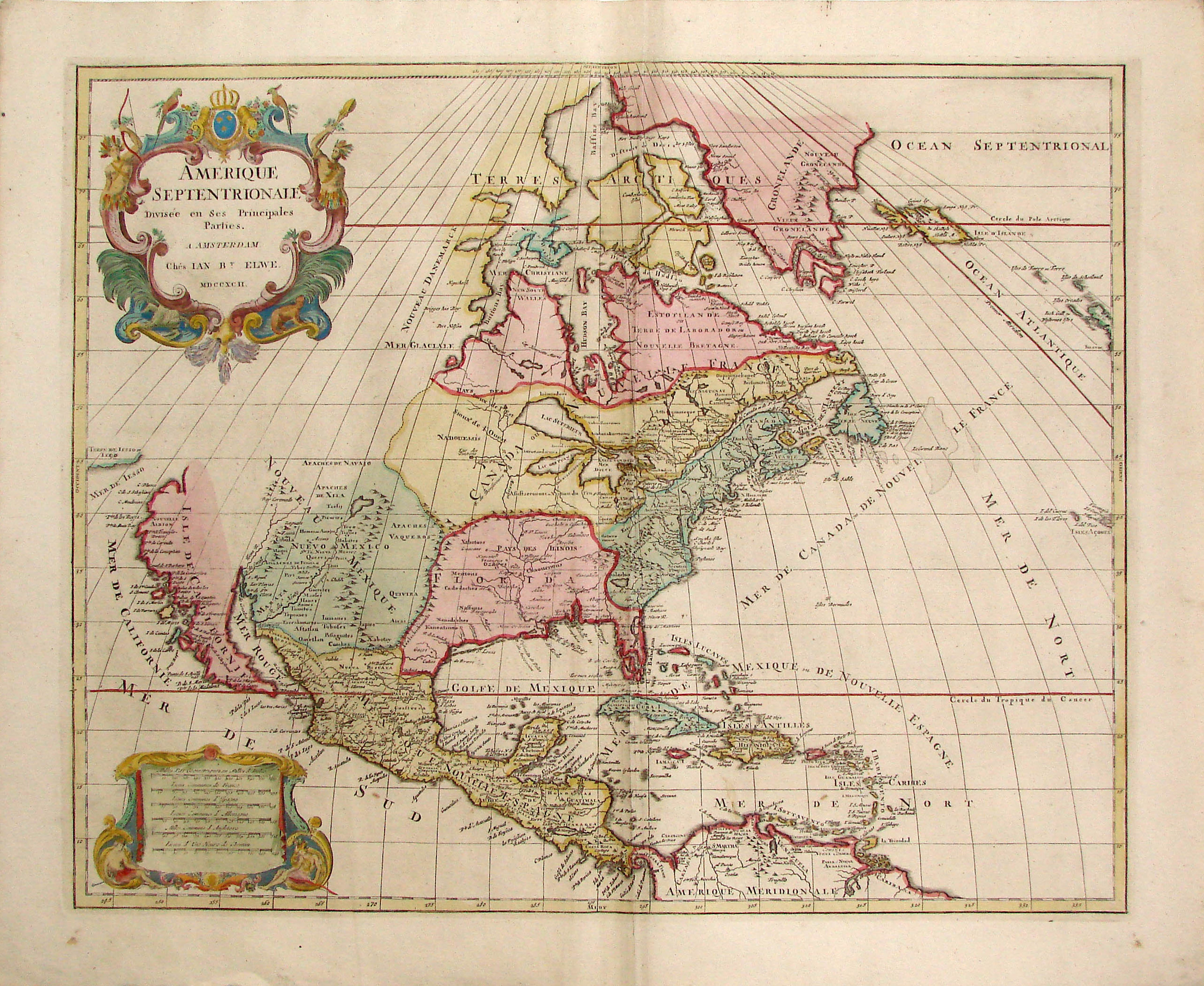
Norteamerica, 1792, Jaillot-Elwe, Spanish Florida's borders after Bernardo Gálvez's military actions, which appear to include Spanish Louisiana and Spanish Texas, as well

On 21 June 1779, Spain formally declared war on Great Britain. On 25 June, a letter from London, marked secret and confidential, went to General John Campbell at Pensacola from King George III and Lord George Germain. Campbell was instructed that it was the object of greatest importance to organize an attack upon New Orleans. If Campbell thought it was possible to reduce the Spanish fort at New Orleans, he was ordered to make preparations immediately. These included securing from Vice-Admiral Sir Peter Parker as many fighting ships as the fleet at Jamaica could spare, gathering all forces in the province that could be assembled, recruiting as many loyal Indians as the Superintendent could provide, and drawing on His Majesty's Treasury through the Lords Commissioners to pay expenses. As an unfortunate twist of fate for Campbell, upon which his whole career was decided, the secret communication fell into the hands of Gálvez. After reading the communication from King George III and Germain, Gálvez, as Governor of Louisiana, swiftly and secretly mobilized the territory for war.

Gálvez carried out a masterful military campaign and defeated the British colonial forces at Fort Bute, Baton Rouge, and Natchez in 1779. The Battle of Baton Rouge, on 21 September 1779, freed the lower Mississippi Valley of British forces and relieved the threat to the capital of Louisiana, New Orleans. In March 1780, Gálvez recaptured Mobile from the British at the Battle of Fort Charlotte.

Gálvez's most important military victory over the British forces occurred 8 May 1781, when he attacked and took by land and by sea Pensacola, the British (and formerly, Spanish) capital of West Florida from General John Campbell of Strachur. The loss of Mobile and Pensacola left the British with no bases along the Gulf coast.

In 1782, forces under Gálvez's overall command captured the British naval base at Nassau on New Providence Island in the Bahamas without a shot being fired. However, Gálvez was angry that the operation had proceeded against his orders and ordered the arrest and imprisonment of Francisco de Miranda, aide-de-camp of Juan Manuel Cajigal, the commander of the expedition. Miranda later explained Gálvez's actions as stemming from jealousy of Cajigal's success.

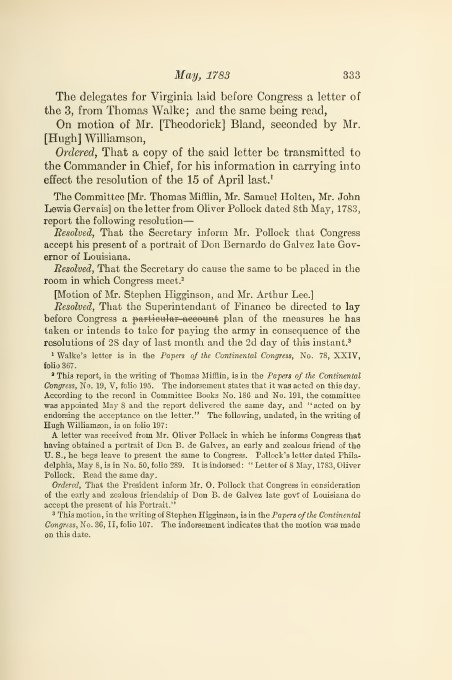
Resolution to display portrait of Bernardo de Gálvez in Congress

On May 9, 1783, the Congressional Congress issued a resolution to display a portrait painting of de Gálvez which was obtained by Oliver Pollock "...in the room in which Congress meet."

Gálvez received many honors from Spain for his military victories against the British, including promotion to lieutenant general and field marshal, governor and captain general of Louisiana and Florida (now separated from Cuba), and the command of the Spanish expeditionary army in America, and titles of Viscount of Gálvez-Town and Count of Gálvez. As evidenced by the insignia that he wore in most every official portrait painting of him, de Gálvez was also awarded the Order of Charles III. However, his insignia was different from the Knight's Cross Order of Charles III; on his, the medallion was connected to the ribbon by a crown device, whereas the Knight's Cross was connected via a wreath.

The American Revolutionary War ended while de Gálvez was preparing a new campaign to take Jamaica. From the American perspective, Gálvez's campaign denied the British the opportunity of encircling the American rebels from the south and kept open a vital conduit for supplies. He also assisted the American revolutionaries with supplies and soldiers, much of it through Oliver Pollock, from whom he received military intelligence concerning the British in West Florida. For France and Spain, Gálvez's military success in the American war effort led to the inclusion of provisions in the Peace of Paris (1783) that officially returned Florida, now divided into two provinces, East and West Florida, to Spain. The treaty recognized the political independence of the former British colonies to the north, and its signing ended their war with the British.

== Viceroy of New Spain ==
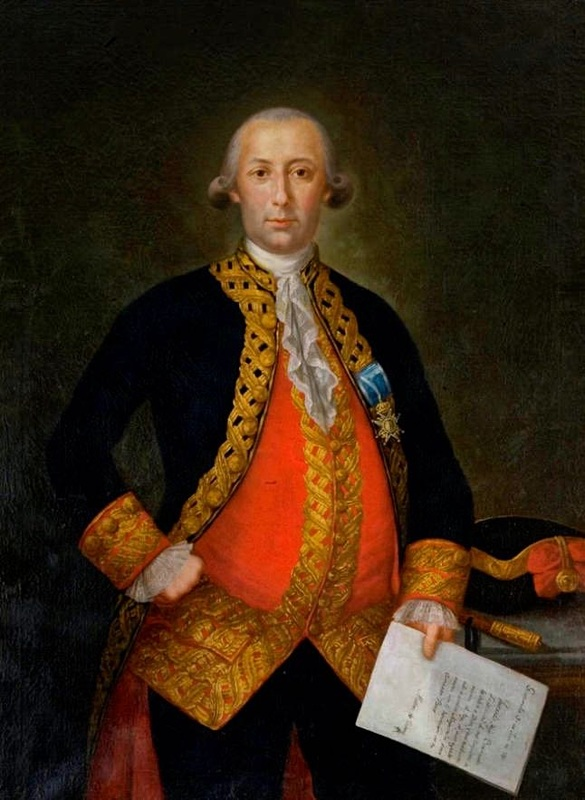
Portrait of Gálvez displayed at the United States Capitol, by Mariano Salvador Maella

In 1783, Bernardo de Gálvez was ennobled to the rank of count, promoted to lieutenant-general of the army, and appointed governor and captain-general of Cuba. He was given the titles Count of Gálvez ("conde de Gálvez") and Viscount of Gálvez-Town ("vizconde de Gálvez-Town") by Carlos III on May 20, 1783. He returned to the Indies in October of the following year to assume his new office. Shortly after he arrived in Havana, his father, Matías de Gálvez y Gallardo (then the viceroy of New Spain), died in November, and Bernardo de Gálvez was appointed to fill the position. He arrived in Vera Cruz, on 21 May 1785, and made his formal entry into Mexico City in June.

During his administration two great calamities occurred: the freeze of September 1785, which led to famine in 1786, and a typhus epidemic that killed 300,000 people the same year. During the famine, Gálvez donated 12,000 pesos of his inheritance and 100,000 pesos he raised from other sources to buy maize and beans for the populace. He also implemented policies to increase future agricultural production.

In 1785, Gálvez initiated construction of Chapultepec Castle. He also ordered the construction of the towers of the cathedral and paving of the streets, as well as the installation of streetlights in Mexico City. He continued work on the highway to Acapulco, and took measures to reduce the abuse of Indian labor on the project. He dedicated 16% of the income from the lottery and other games of chance to charity.

Gálvez helped advance science in the colony by sponsoring the Royal Botanical Expedition to New Spain, led by Martín Sessé y Lacasta. This expedition of botanists and naturalists resulted in a comprehensive catalog, a collaborative work published in Spain as the Flora Mexicana, which catalogued the diverse species of plants, birds, and fish found in New Spain.

On one occasion, when the viceroy was riding on horseback to meet with the Audiencia (according to his own report), he encountered a party of soldiers escorting three criminals to the gallows. He suspended the hanging, and later had the criminals freed.

After the typhus epidemic of 1786 had abated in early autumn, Bernardo de Gálvez apparently became one of its last victims, and was confined to his bed. On 8 November 1786, he turned over all his governmental duties except the captain generalship to the Audiencia. On 30 November 1786, Galvez died at the age of 40 in Tacubaya (now part of Mexico City). Gálvez was buried next to his father at San Fernando Church in Mexico City.

Bernardo de Gálvez left some writings, including Ordenanzas para el Teatro de Comedias de México and Instrución para el Buen Gobierno de las Provincias Internas de la Nueva España (Instructions for Governing the Interior Provinces of New Spain, 1786), the latter of which remained in effect until the colonial period ended. In his "Instructions", Gálvez advocated a policy of selling the Indians rifles and trade goods to make them dependent on the Spanish government, and sanctioned war against the Apache if these inducements failed to pacify them.

== Legacy ==
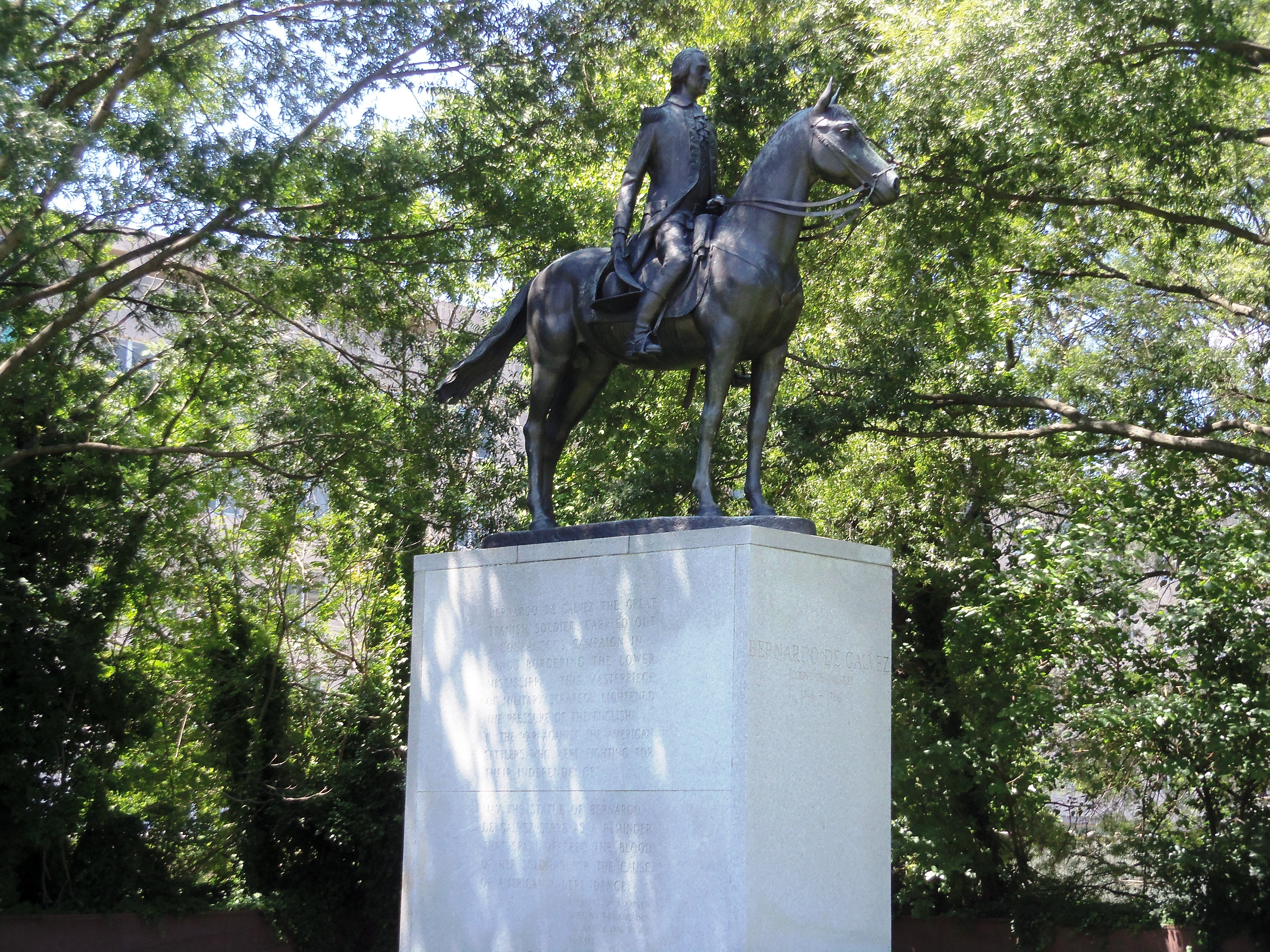
Equestrian statue of Gálvez in Virginia Avenue, Washington D.C.

Galveston, Texas, Galveston Bay, Galveston County, Galvez, Louisiana, and St. Bernard Parish, Louisiana, were, among other places, named after him. The Louisiana parishes of East Feliciana and West Feliciana (originally a single parish) were said to have been named for his wife Marie Felicite de Saint-Maxent d'Estrehan.

The Cabildo, a branch of the Louisiana State Museum located on Jackson Square in New Orleans, has a portrait of General Gálvez accompanied by a display of biographical information. Spanish Plaza, in the Central Business District of the city, has an equestrian statue of Gálvez adjacent to the New Orleans World Trade Center. There is also a Galvez Street in New Orleans. Mobile, Alabama, also has a Spanish Plaza with a statue of Gálvez.

In Baton Rouge, Louisiana (present-day state capital), Galvez Plaza is laid out next to City Hall and used frequently as a site for municipal events. Also, the 13-story Galvez Building is part of the state government's administrative office-building complex in the Capitol Park section of downtown Baton Rouge.

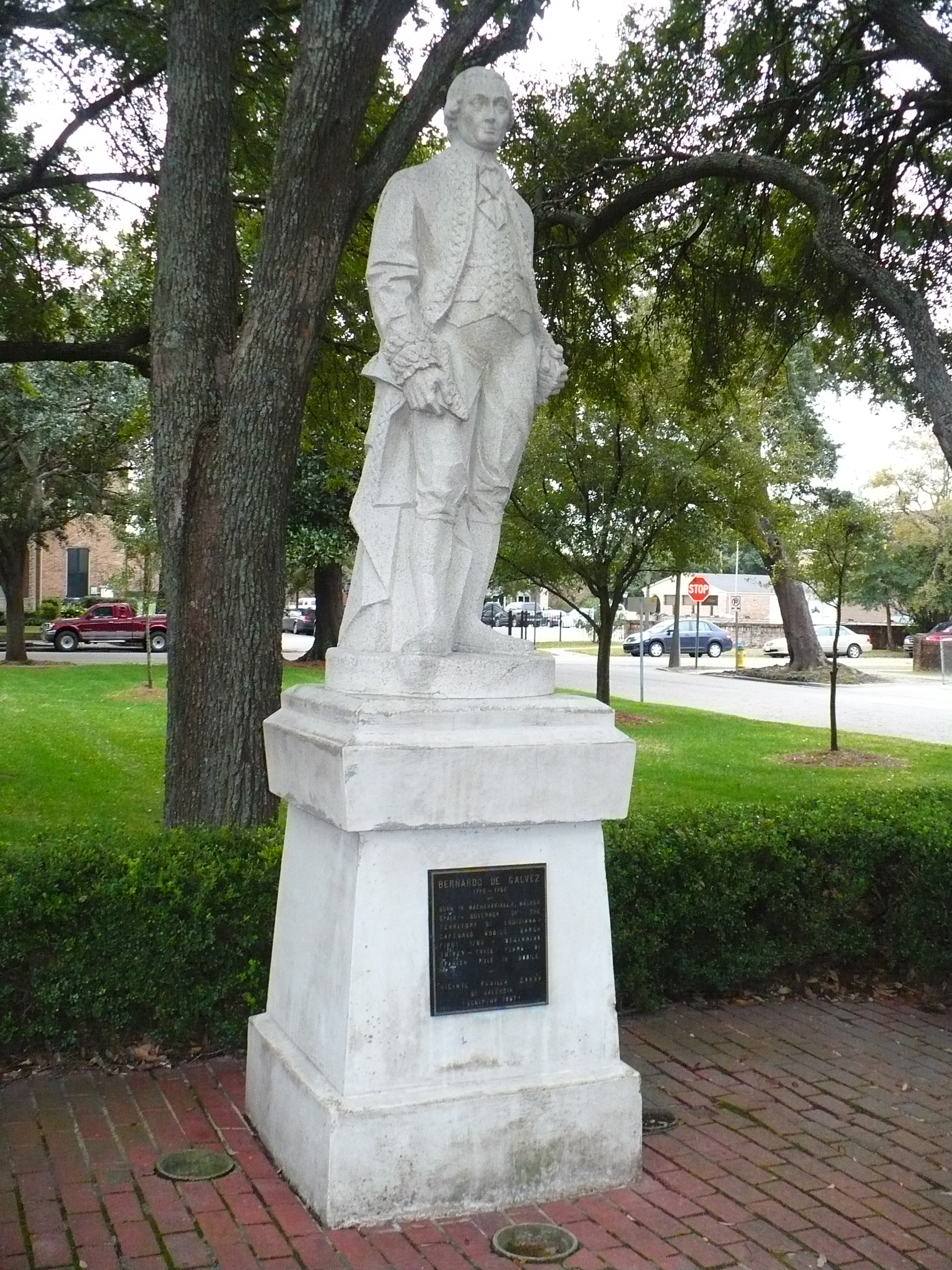
Statue of Bernardo de Gálvez in Spanish Plaza, Mobile, Alabama

In 1911, the Hotel Galvez was built in Galveston Avenue P, where the hotel is located, is known as Bernardo de Galvez Avenue. The hotel was added to the National Register of Historic Places on 4 April 1979.

On December 16, 2014, the United States Congress conferred honorary citizenship on Gálvez, citing him as a "hero of the Revolutionary War who risked his life for the freedom of the United States people and provided supplies, intelligence, and strong military support to the war effort." In 2019, the Spanish Government placed a 32-inch-tall (80 cm) statue of Gálvez in front of the Spanish Embassy in Washington, D.C. Also, on December 9, 2014, a replica of a 1784 portrait of Gálvez by Mariano Salvador Maella—the replica of which was painted by Spanish artist Carlos Monserrate—was unveiled December 9, 2014, in Senate Foreign Relations Committee room (S-116 of the United States Capitol Building). This act fulfilled the May 9, 1783, resolution to display such a portrait of de Gálvez in Congress.

In June 2024, the USS Galvez (FFG-67), a Constellation-class frigate, was named after him. FFG-67 was cancelled along with the rest of Constellation-class frigates in November 2025.

== Heraldry ==
Heraldry of Bernardo de Gálvez

Coat of Arms as Count of Gálvez (1783–1786)

== See also ==
- Bernardo de Gálvez, the 1976 equestrian statue in Washington, D.C.
- Gálveztown (brig sloop) – captured British ship renamed and participated in the capture of Mobile (1780); replica built in Spain more than 200 years later.
- Spain and the American Revolutionary War
- Matías de Gálvez y Gallardo, Bernardo's father
- José de Gálvez, Bernardo's uncle
- USS Galvez, American frigate named after Bernardo

== Notes ==
Government offices
Preceded by Matías de Gálvez y Gallardo	Viceroy of New Spain; 1785–1786	Succeeded by Alonso Núñez de Haro y Peralta
Spanish nobility
Preceded by New creation	Count of Gálvez; 1783–1786	Succeeded by Miguel de Gálvez
