= Durnford =

Durnford is a surname, and may refer to:

- Anthony Durnford, British Army officer
- Elias Durnford, British Army officer
- Elias Walker Durnford, British engineer
- Isaac Durnford, Canadian actor
- John Durnford, Admiral in the Royal Navy
- John Durnford (cricketer), English cricketer
- Richard Durnford, Bishop of Chichester
- John Durnford-Slater, British Army officer
- Robin Durnford-Slater, Admiral in the Royal Navy

== See also ==
- Durnford, Wiltshire, a parish in England
- Durnford School, Dorset, England
- Mount Durnford, Antarctica
