= Montfort Browne =

British Army officer

Brigadier-General Montfort Browne

4th Governor of British West Florida
- In office Jan 1767 – Nov 1769
- Preceded by: George Johnstone
- Succeeded by: John Eliot

22nd Royal Governor of the Bahamas
- In office 1775–1776
- Preceded by: William Shirley
- Succeeded by: John Gambier

Personal details
- Born: ca. 1735 Port Eliot, Cornwall, England
- Died: ca. 1786
- Spouse: Louisa Mysnell
- Profession: Royal Army officer and Governor

Montfort Browne (ca. 1735 –1785) was a British Army officer and Tory, and a major landowner and developer of British West Florida in the 1760s and 1770s. He commanded the Prince of Wales' American Regiment, a Loyalist regiment, in the American Revolutionary War. He served as lieutenant governor of West Florida from 1766 to 1769, acting as governor from 1767, and then as governor of the Bahamas from 1774 to 1780.

== Life ==
Montfort Browne was from an Irish family: he was one of the three sons of Edmund Browne of New Grove, County Clare and Jane Westropp, daughter of Mountfort Westropp of Attyflin, County Limerick. In 1764 Edmund and his sons were jointly granted 20,000 acres (8,094 hectares) of land in West Florida. Montfort made an "ill-advised" marriage to Louisa Mysnell: the marriage was unhappy and childless, and the couple soon separated. According to his own writings, he served in the 35th Regiment of Foot during the Seven Years' War, where he saw much action in the West Indies, and was twice wounded. In 1763, a complaint was lodged against him that resulted in an unfavourable court of inquiry against him. When the British took control of West Florida after the war, Browne sponsored French Huguenot and Irish immigrants to the area. Through a patronage connection with the colonial secretary, the Earl of Hillsborough, he secured the lieutenant governorship of the new province in November 1764. Accompanied by his Irish recruits, he arrived at the provincial capital, Pensacola, in January 1766.

=== West Florida ===
His first year as lieutenant governor was turbulent. Some of his land claims were contested, and the property he owned on Dauphin Island was found to be unsuitable for the population he had planned to settle there. His relationship with Governor George Johnstone was strained when Browne sided with the military in disputes between them and the governor. Johnstone left West Florida in January 1767, leaving Browne in command of the province.

Browne, in 1768, led a successful expedition to the region of Natchez, bringing back a report of the fertility of the land and its lack of population, and suggesting that it be developed. For his services in the war he had been awarded 20,000 acres (8,100 ha) in the province, and he used the trip to stake out large parcels of land on the eastern banks of the Mississippi River, just north of present-day Baton Rouge, Louisiana. Irregularities in Browne's bookkeeping in 1768 drew criticism from his patron Hillsborough, and Browne formally requested that his books be audited when Johnstone's successor John Eliot arrived in April 1769. Unfortunately, Eliot committed suicide a month after his arrival, and Browne reluctantly retook the reins of power. He sent the provincial surveyor, Elias Durnford, to London in May 1769 to answer ongoing complaints that colonists were making against him, but Durnford returned that December with orders removing Browne from power and granting Durnford an acting governorship.

As Browne was preparing to leave the province, he was involved in a duel with a Pensacolan trader. The man was wounded, and Browne would have faced criminal charges had the man died. Fortunately for Browne, he recovered, and Browne sailed for England in February 1770. He spent much of the next two years in England, having his finances scrutinized by the colonial office, and continuing to drum up interest in settlements on the Mississippi. There was public speculation on both sides of the Atlantic that the Mississippi lands would eventually be separated into their own province, with Browne as its governor. Hillsborough was apparently supportive of the idea, and resigned as colonial secretary when it was rejected. Browne continued to lobby Hillsborough's successor, the Earl of Dartmouth, for the establishment of a province on the Mississippi, but was unsuccessful. He was instead eventually granted the governorship of the Bahamas in March 1774.

=== Bahamas and Revolutionary War service ===
While governor of the Bahamas, Browne continued to promote the desirability of land on the Mississippi. At one point he advertised for sale tracts of land as large as 150,000 acres (61,000 ha), suggesting that he had acquired more land while in England. He made several trips from the Bahamas to West Florida to pursue his interests in 1774 and 1775. After the American Revolutionary War broke out in 1775, he took some precautions to secure Nassau. He had had ample warning that the Americans might make an attack there, but was caught off guard when American ships arrived off Nassau's sandbar at the entrance to its port on the morning of 3 March 1776. He rushed to Government House in his nightshirt to order the firing of cannon to summon the militia. Though he managed to get most of the island's gunpowder stores away to St. Augustine, Florida, he failed to hold the island and was taken prisoner. With 12 other high-ranking hostages from the island he was taken back to the Chesapeake Bay by the American fleet, and was released, in part, by the efforts of his friend Timothy Hierlihy, in exchange for William Alexander.

In 1777, then a colonel, Browne wrote to the British government of his discontent at serving under the authority of two brigadier generals "who have never seen a Shot fired", seeking promotion to major general. He was instead promoted to the rank of brigadier general himself, remaining in that rank for the duration of his service. Browne formed the Loyalist Prince of Wales' American Regiment, served at the siege of Rhode Island, and spent some time in Florida before finally returning to the Bahamas to resume his post there in July 1778. He then faced accusations of cowardice and incompetence for his conduct of the battle and, after dismissing his council in an attempt to scotch the rumours (an unprecedented move), he was replaced by John Robert Maxwell two years later in 1780.

== Bibliography ==
- Acts of the Privy Council of England 1745-1766
- Burke, Sir Bernard A genealogical and heraldic history of the landed gentry of Ireland London 1912
- Michael Craton, Gail Saunders, Islanders in the Stream
- David J. Libby, Slavery and Frontier Mississippi, 1720–1835
- Limerick City Archives
- Fabel, Robin (November 1993). "An Eighteenth Colony: Dreams for Mississippi on the Eve of the Revolution". The Journal of Southern History. 59 (4): 647–672. doi:10.2307/2210537. JSTOR 2210537.

| Preceded by George Johnstone | Acting Governor of British West Florida; 1767–April 1769 | Succeeded by John Eliot |
| Preceded by John Eliot | Acting Governor of British West Florida; April–December 1769 | Succeeded by Elias Durnford (acting) |
| Preceded by Sir Thomas Shirley | Governor of The Bahamas; 1774–1780 | Succeeded by John Robert Maxwell |
