= Francisco Collell =

Spanish governor of West Florida

7th Governor of West Florida
- In office October 1810 – February 1811
- Preceded by: Francisco San Maxent
- Succeeded by: Francisco San Maxent

Personal details
- Born: Unknown
- Died: Unknown
- Profession: Military and Governor of Florida

Francisco Collell was a Spanish military official and politician who served as interim governor of West Florida between October 1810 and February 1811. He was also sub-lieutenant and Commandant of Galvez Town, Louisiana.

== Biography ==
Francisco Collell joined the Spanish Army in his youth and rose to the rank of comandante (commandant).

In 1779, after being promoted to sub-lieutenant and still retaining the title of "Commandant" of Galvez Town, Louisiana, Collell laid out land lots and constructed houses in Galvez Town for the Spanish Canarian settlers (Isleños). He strived conscientiously to guide the poverty-stricken and ill-equipped Isleños, who lacked the basic necessities of clothing and adequate food rations, as they struggled with periodic famines, floods, and epidemics of malaria.

Francisco Collell was appointed interim governor of West Florida in October 1810 and remained in that office until February 1811, when he was replaced by Francisco de San Maxent.

== Legacy ==
- Colyell, Louisiana was named after Francisco Collell.
