= Vicente Folch =

Spanish colonial governor

Juan Vicente Folch

5th Governor of West Florida
- In office June 1796 – March 1811
- Preceded by: Francisco de Paula Gelabert
- Succeeded by: Francisco San Maxent

Personal details
- Born: March 8, 1754 Reus, Tarragona (Catalonia, Spain)
- Died: 1829 (aged 74–75) Havana, Cuba
- Profession: Military officer and governor of West Florida

Juan Vicente Folch y Juan (1754–1829) was a Spanish military officer who served as the governor of West Florida from June 1796 to March 1811.

== Early years and military career ==
Vicente Folch was born in Reus, near Barcelona in the Catalan province of Tarragona, on March 8, 1754. He was a nephew of the governor of Spanish Louisiana, Esteban Rodríguez Miró. Folch studied mathematics and engineering at the Royal Military Academy of Barcelona and on April 23, 1771, he was commissioned a sublieutenant in the 2nd Regiment of Light Infantry of Catalonia in the Spanish army. He rose through the ranks, and was promoted to lieutenant colonel on October 5, 1802.

After finishing his studies in 1774, Folch fought in military campaigns in North Africa and the Mediterranean for several years, including the Siege of Melilla (1774–75), the Invasion of Algiers, and the siege of Gibraltar (1780). He was promoted to lieutenant in 1780 and in 1786 he attained the rank of captain. Folch arrived in America in 1780 with the field army (Ejército de Operaciones) commanded by Victoriano de Navia, and worked his way through the ranks until he was promoted to captain on November 22, 1786. Seven months later, on June 19, 1787, he was appointed commandant of the post at Mobile, where he organized discovery and punitive expeditions against the Maroons. In August 1793, Folch was assigned a naval expedition to map the central part of the west coast of the province of East Florida, the area around Tampa Bay. After successfully completing this arduous task, the governor of Louisiana, Baron Carondelet, appointed him to command two small vessels that he had outfitted to patrol the coast near the mouth of the Mississippi River. Folch performed this service from July, 1794, to July, 1795. On July 28, 1795, Carondelet then appointed Folch the new commandant of the fort of San Fernando de las Barrancas. This was a hardship post at Chickasaw Bluffs overlooking the Mississippi, the present-day site of Memphis, Tennessee. Folch served there until September 1796. He was next assigned duty at Pensacola, where he served as commandant from September 30, 1795, through March 30, 1804. In June 1796 he was appointed governor of West Florida.

== Government of West Florida and final years ==
After visiting Baton Rouge several times, Governor Folch insisted on being received with the honors due his office when he went to New Orleans on official business. He promoted road construction in Florida and the building of a road from Mobile to better protect Baton Rouge. He also reorganized and reinforced the troops stationed in the forts at Pensacola and Mobile.

When he received notice of the Kemper brothers' rebellion in Baton Rouge and their incursion into West Florida on August 7, 1804, to incite a revolution, Folch was concerned that the insurrection was a serious threat to Spanish control of Florida. He sent a troop of 150 soldiers from Pensacola to suppress the revolt; they arrived in September, and defeated the insurrectionists, who had failed to gain the support of local Anglo-American settlers, most of whom were satisfied with Spanish rule.

In 1811, fearing the possibility that Great Britain would occupy Florida in its war against Napoleon, Folch decided to cede West Florida to the United States temporarily.

Folch was promoted to brigadier in 1810, and replaced by his son-in-law Francisco Maximiliano Saint Maxent La Roche in March 1811 as governor of West Florida. He then went to Havana, where he served as a member of the Estado Mayor (General Staff) and as second to the Captain General of Cuba. He was appointed Field Marshal of the Spanish Royal Armies and decorated with the Grand Cross of the Royal and Military Order of Saint Hermenegild (Real y Militar Orden de San Hermenegildo). He died in 1829 in Havana.
