= Governor Eliot =

Governor Eliot, Elliot, or Elliott may refer to:

- Andrew Elliot (1728–1797), 41st Governor of New York in 1783
- Charles Elliot (1801–1875), Governor of Bermuda from 1846 to 1854, Governor of Trinidad from 1854 to 1856, and Governor of Saint Helena from 1863 to 1869
- Charles Eliot (diplomat) (1862–1931), Governor of Kenya from 1900 to 1904
- George Augustus Eliott, 1st Baron Heathfield (1717–1790), Governor of Londonderry from 1774 to 1775 and Governor of Gibraltar from 1777 to 1790
- Hugh Elliot (1752–1830), Governor of the Leeward Islands from 1809 to 1814 and Governor of Madras from 1814 to 1820
- John Eliot (Royal Navy officer) (1742–1769), 5th Governor of British West Florida in 1769
- John Elliot (Royal Navy officer) (1732–1808), Governor of Newfoundland from 1786 to 1789
- John C. Elliott (1919–2001), Governor of American Samoa in 1952
- Roger Elliott (governor) (1665–1714), Governor of Gibraltar from 1707 to 1711
