= John C. Pace Library =

Academic library of the University of West Florida

Coordinates: 30.5500228°N 87.2172729°W

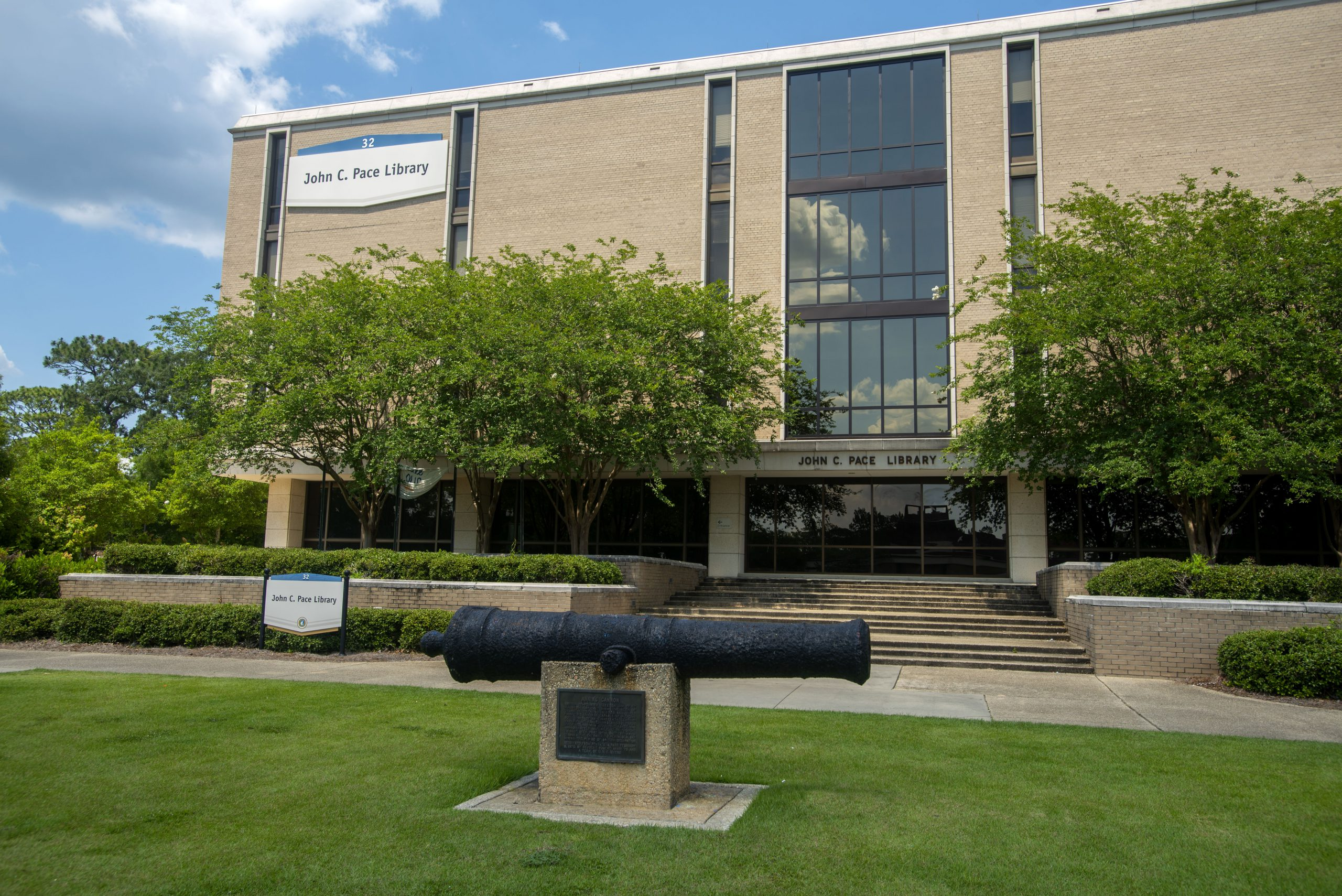
- Location: Pensacola, Florida
- Type: Academic library
- Established: 1966

Collection
- Items collected: 752,000 printed volumes, 1.2 million microfilms and microfiches, 5,100 serial subscriptions and nearly 2,000 online journal subscriptions
- Size: more than 752,000 items (2020)

Other information
- Website: uwf.edu/library/about/

The John C. Pace Library is the academic library of the University of West Florida and is the largest library in Northwest Florida. In addition to the main library on the main campus north of Pensacola, Florida, there is a branch library in Fort Walton Beach, Florida. It has 752,000 printed volumes, 1.2 million microfilms and microfiches, 5,100 serial subscriptions and nearly 2,000 online journal subscriptions.

Subject areas best covered by the library include history, geography, genealogy, environmental studies, art and architecture, health and medicine, biography, technology, legal history, archaeology, and other subjects pertinent to West Florida, its people, organizations, and institutions

In addition, it is a selective depository for publications of the United States government and the state of Florida, and has a well-known Special Collections department that houses over one million items, including 920 individual manuscripts and archival collections, 80,000 photographs, 2,000 maps, and 10,000 items relating to the history of West Florida.

The Pace Library holds the archives of the British Indian-trading firm Panton, Leslie & Company, headquartered in Pensacola, and of the firm's attorney, John Innerarity.
