= Colyell, Louisiana =

- Unincorporated community
- Location in Louisiana Location in the United States
- Coordinates: 30°23′26″N 90°46′12″W
- Country: United States
- State: Louisiana
- Parish: Livingston
- Elevation: 26 ft (7.9 m)
- Time zone: UTC-6 (CST)
  - Summer (DST): UTC-5 (CDT)
- Area code: 225

Colyell is an unincorporated community in Livingston Parish, Louisiana, United States. It was named after Francisco Collell, who was the commandant of Galveztown in 1779.

Currently, the only school located in the Colyell area is Frost School, with grades pre-kindergarten through eighth. Colyell supports a community ball park, located on Perrilloux Road. It also has a volunteer fire department, part of the Livingston Parish Fire Protection District 7.

Residents use Livingston as their home mailing address. The area code for Colyell is 225; and the telephone prefix is 698, the same as for French Settlement.
