= Mauricio de Zúñiga =

19th-century Spanish Governor of Florida

11th Spanish Governor of West Florida
- In office July 1812 – April 1813
- Preceded by: Francisco San Maxent
- Succeeded by: Mateo González Manrique

14th Spanish Governor of West Florida
- In office March 1816 – 15 September 1816
- Preceded by: José de Soto
- Succeeded by: Francisco San Maxent

Personal details
- Born: 1748 La Coruña Spain)
- Died: 1816 Havana?
- Profession: Military and Administrator (governor of West Florida)

Mauricio de Zúñiga (died 1816) was a Spanish military officer who served as governor of West Florida from 1812 to 1813, and again in 1816.

During his first term of office, Mobile was taken over by the US Army. In his second term of office, the Negro Fort was over-run, which would later escalate into the First Seminole Wars, resulting in the loss of sovereignty of Spanish Florida.

== Early years ==
Mauricio de Zúñiga was born in the 18th century, probably in El Prat de Llobregat, in Baix Llobregat (Barcelona Province, Catalonia, Spain). As a youth, he joined the Spanish army, where he rose to the rank of Lieutenant Colonel.

== Political career ==
=== First tenure ===
In July 1812, Zúñiga was appointed governor of West Florida, and moved to its capital, Pensacola. He served in that office until April 1813.

During his tenure, Mobile had been a Spanish possession before the beginning of the Patriot War, but Congress had declared it American territory after the War of 1812 started. After Spanish forces evacuated Mobile, in April 1813 the Americans built a redoubt on Mobile Point. The final attachment of Mobile to the United States from the Spanish Empire was the only permanent exchange of territory during the War of 1812.

=== Second tenure ===
In 1814, during the War of 1812, the British established an outpost that became known as the Negro Fort on Prospect Bluff along the Spanish side of the Apalachicola River It became a refuge for escaped slaves from Pensacola, St. Augustine, and Georgia. Following their defeats at Mobile and Pensacola, the British returned to Prospect Bluff to reorganize. Over the next few months, an assembly of nearly 1500 British troops and Indian allies of the British gathered at the fort, working and training under the leadership of George Woodbine and Edward Nicolls. They were joined by several hundred fugitive African American slaves and Blacks redeemed from their bondage to the Indians. The British withdrew from the post on May 16, 1815 and left the Black population in occupation.

After Zúñiga resumed the governorship of West Florida in March 1816, Andrew Jackson, commander of the Southern Military Division of the United States, wrote him on April 23, and demanded that the Spanish authorities immediately intervene to destroy or remove the denizens of the fort and the surrounding community of escaped slaves and Indians.

Zúñiga, who wanted to maintain good relations with the Native Americans of Florida (who would be outraged if the Negro Fort was attacked) and, at the same time, wanted to avoid a military invasion by Jackson, stated in his reply dated May 26, 1816, that he also was concerned about the fort, but awaited instructions from his superiors what to do about the matter.

Soon afterward, however, someone from the fort fired shots at an American supply ship. This gave Jackson the excuse he needed to order the attack and destruction of the fort by General Edmund P. Gaines on July 27, 1816, in which almost all of its residents were killed. Nevertheless, the number of runaway slaves from Georgia who subsequently fled to Florida was still significant.

Zúñiga's term as governor ended on 15 September 1816, and he died near the end of that year.
