= University of West Florida =

Public university in Pensacola, Florida, US

- Motto: "No Limit"!
- Type: Public university
- Established: 1963; 63 years ago
- Parent institution: State University System of Florida
- Accreditation: SACS
- Academic affiliations: Space-grant
- Endowment: $117.7 million (2025)
- President: Manny Díaz Jr.
- Faculty: 374
- Students: 15,601
- Undergraduates: 9,646
- Postgraduates: 4,697
- Location: Pensacola, Florida, United States; 30.5495°N 87.2181°W
- Campus: 1,600 acres (6.5 km^{2}); Small city
- Other campuses: Fort Walton Beach
- Newspaper: The Voyager
- Colors: Argo Navy and Argo Green
- Nicknames: Argonauts; Argos
- Sporting affiliations: NCAA Division I – ASUN; UAC
- Mascot: Argie the Argonaut
- Website: www.uwf.edu

The University of West Florida (West Florida or UWF) is a public research university in Pensacola, Florida, United States. It was established in 1963 as a member institution of the State University System of Florida and sits on the third-largest campus—1,600 acres (650 ha)—in the State University System. The university's mascot is Argie the Argonaut.

== History ==
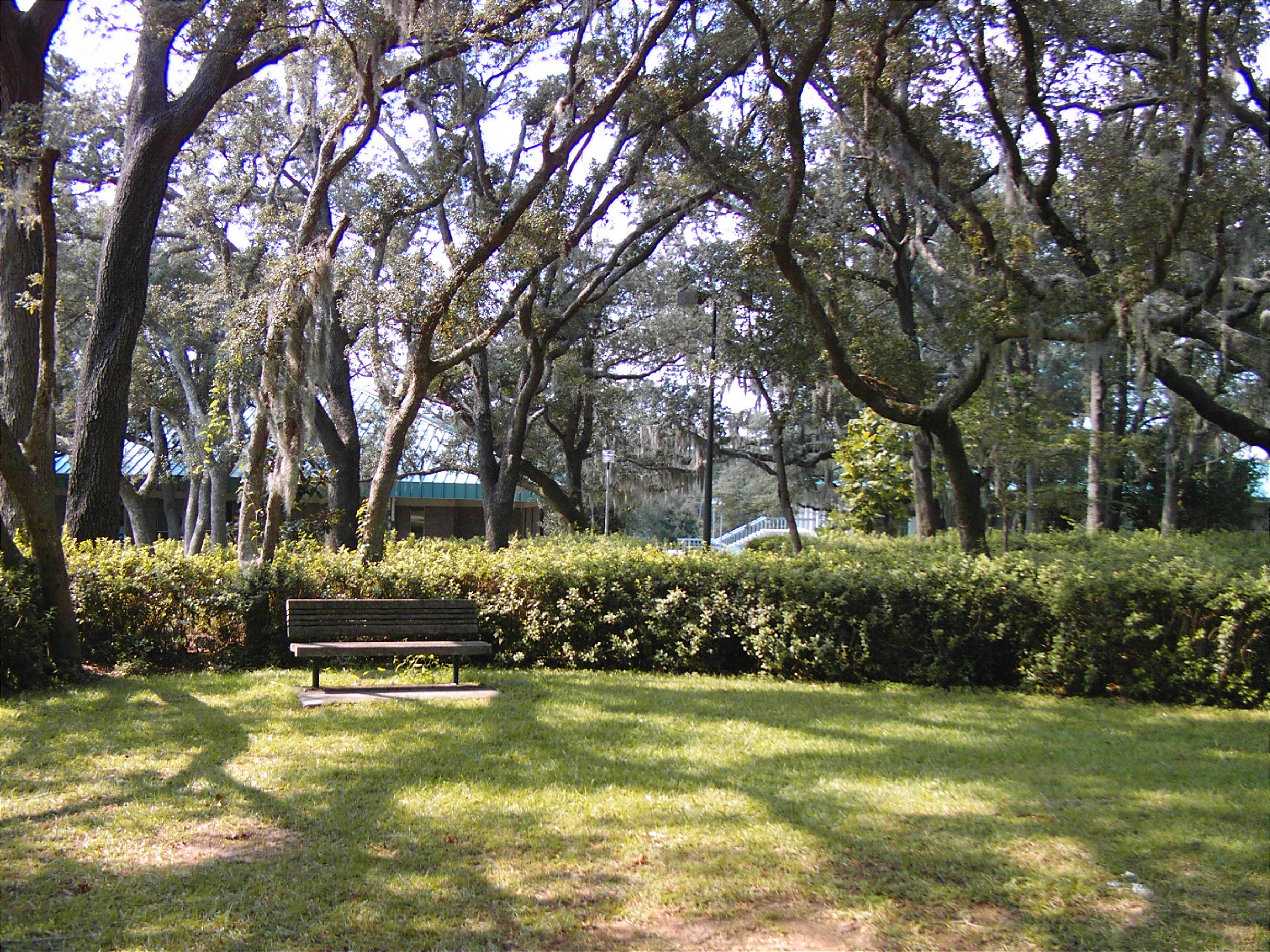
Foliage at UWF

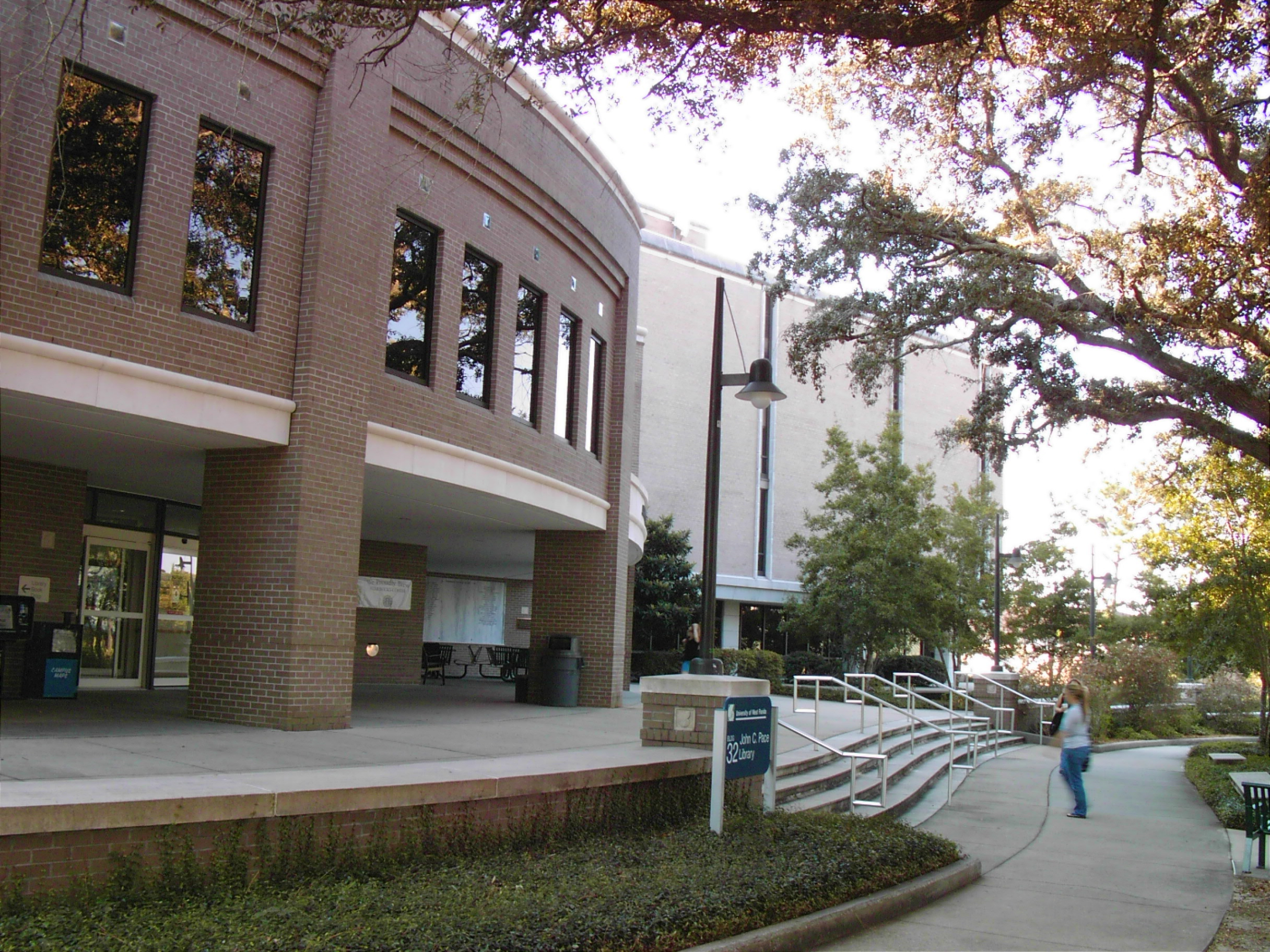
The entrance of the John C. Pace library

In 1962, the Florida Legislature authorized the State Board of Education to locate a state university in Escambia County. Harold Crosby was appointed the first president in July 1964. UWF became the sixth institution of the State University System of Florida, which today consists of twelve public universities.

Ground was broken on April 16, 1965, and in the same year the chambered nautilus was adopted as the official UWF emblem. UWF was originally an upper-level institution, enrolling juniors, seniors and graduate students. The first students began classes in the fall of 1967, and in June 1968, 58 students received degrees in the first commencement ceremony. In 1969, the Southern Association of Colleges and Schools accredited the university undergraduate programs and the first master's degree programs were established.

In July 1979, the university organized into a more traditional structure by establishing three colleges: Arts and Sciences, Business, and Education. In 1999, the colleges reorganized into the College of Arts and Sciences, the College of Business and the College of Professional Studies. In Aug. 2012, the former three-college structure transitioned into four academic colleges: College of Arts, Social Sciences and Humanities; College of Education and Professional Studies; College of Science, Engineering and Health; and the College of Business. The most recent reorganization took place in 2015, splitting the former College of Science, Engineering and Health in two.

Today, the university has four colleges: College of Arts, Social Sciences and Humanities; College of Business; Hal Marcus College of Science and Engineering; and Usha Kundu, MD College of Health. In addition, UWF has the School of Education.

=== Chambered nautilus ===
Harold Crosby, the university's first president, selected the chambered nautilus to represent UWF because he was inspired by the poem "The Chambered Nautilus" by Oliver Wendell Holmes; it is "a symbol of growth, change and accomplishment."

The chambered nautilus remained the primary institutional logo until July 2026, when the university introduced a new primary logo featuring a stylized UWF lettermark as part of a comprehensive brand refresh. The nautilus continues to be used in the presidential seal and other heritage elements of the university’s visual identity.

== Administration, academics and organization ==
Academic rankings

Master's
- Washington Monthly: 103

Regional
- U.S. News & World Report: 26

National
- Forbes: 442
- WSJ/College Pulse: 600

2024–2025 USNWR Best Regional Colleges South Rankings
| Regional Universities South (tie) | 23 |
| Top Public Schools (tie) | 10 |
| Top Performers on Social Mobility (tie) | 37 |
| Best Value School | 48 |
| Best Undergraduate Engineering (tie) | 150 |
| Nursing (tie) | 254 |
| Best colleges for Veterans (tie) | 9 |

The University of West Florida is a public institution, receiving most of its funding through state funds and tuition. A 13-member Board of Trustees governs the university. The board is composed of six members appointed by the Governor of Florida, five appointed by the Board of Governors, the Faculty Senate president and the president of the Student Government Association.

The undergraduate and graduate programs are divided into four colleges: College of Arts, Social Sciences and Humanities; College of Business; Hal Marcus College of Science and Engineering; and Usha Kundu, MD College of Health.

The University of West Florida is composed of four divisions which manage the operations of the institution as well as its direct support organizations: Academic Affairs; Academic Engagement and Student Affairs; Finance and Administration; and University Advancement.

== Campuses ==
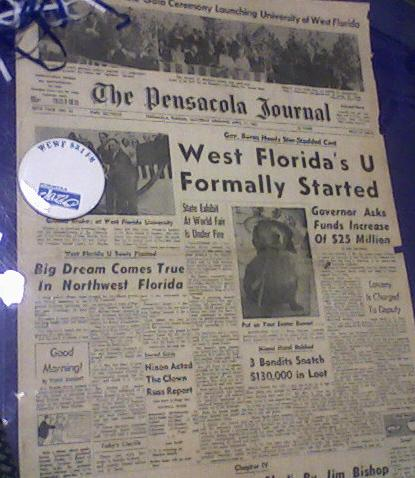
A 1965 edition of the Pensacola Journal announcing the beginning of UWF

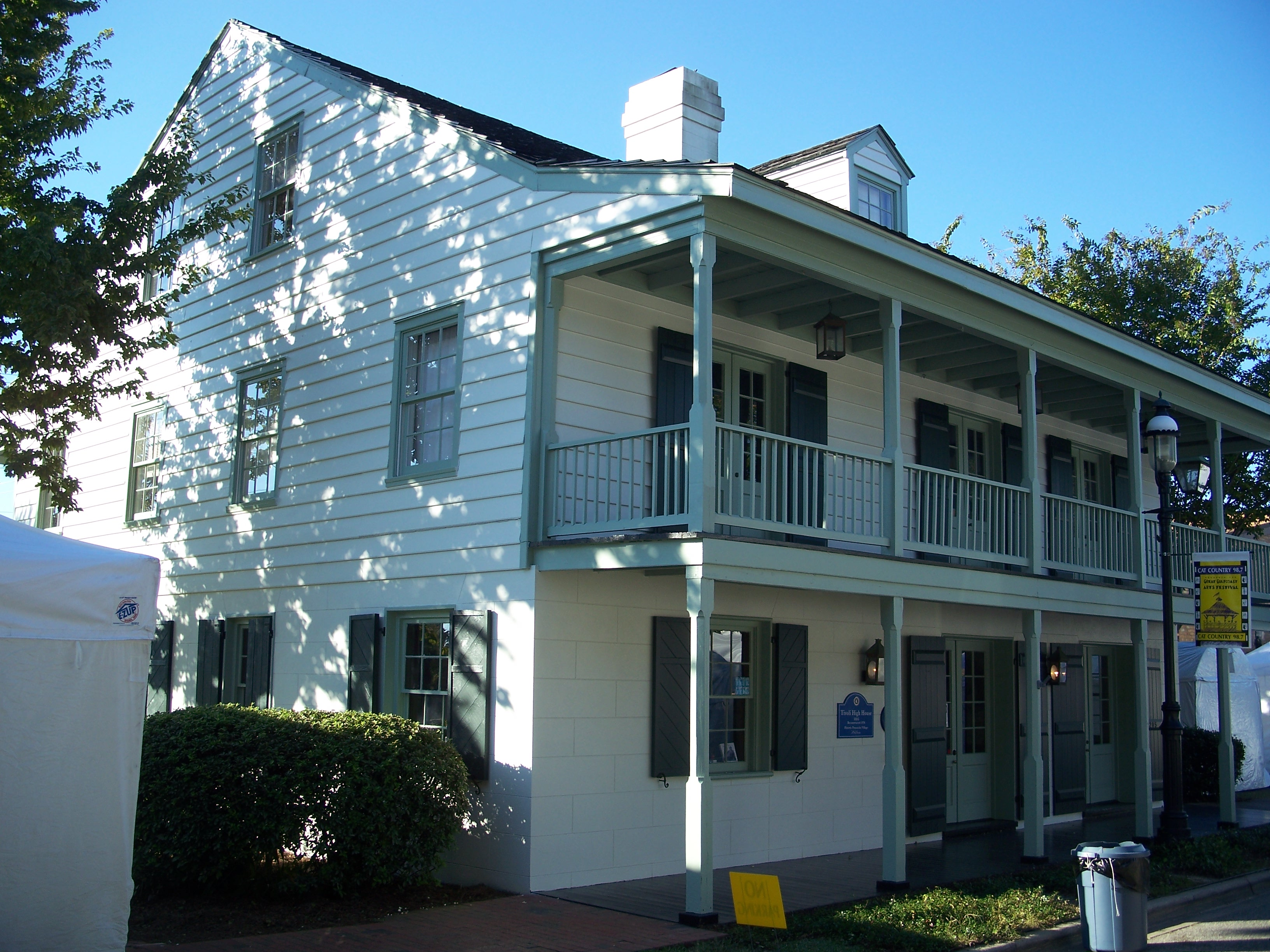
The Tivoli House, one of UWF's historic properties

=== Pensacola campus ===
The main campus of 1,600 acres (6.5 km^{2}) of hills and natural woodland along the Escambia River is ten miles (16 km) north of downtown Pensacola, in the Ferry Pass area. Its facilities have been designed to complement the natural forest and waterways. UWF's John C. Pace Library is the largest library in the Northwest Florida area. In addition to the main library on the main campus north of Pensacola, Florida, there is a branch library in Fort Walton Beach, Florida. It has 628,000 printed volumes, 1 million microfilms and microfiches, 3,000 serial subscriptions and nearly 2,000 online journal subscriptions. UWF has a second location, UWF on the Emerald Coast, in Fort Walton Beach, Florida.

=== Historic Pensacola Village ===
In 2001, the university acquired West Florida Historic Preservation, Inc, the previously state-controlled group that manages the Historic Pensacola Village. The university has created several classes taught by and/or in conjunction with the staff at Historic Pensacola.

== UWF Historic Trust ==
The UWF Historic Trust collects, preserves and interprets the history of northwest Florida.

=== Arcadia Mill Complex ===
The Arcadia Mill complex is on the National Register of Historic Places. It was the first industrial complex powered by water in Florida. It included shops, mills, a railroad drawn by mules and a 16-mile log flume. It operated from 1817 to 1855. It is curated by the University of West Florida.

== Student life ==
Undergraduate demographics as of Fall 2023
| Race and ethnicity | Total |
|---|---|
| White | 62% |
| Hispanic | 11% |
| Black | 10% |
| Two or more races | 6% |
| Unknown | 5% |
| Asian | 3% |
| International student | 2% |
Economic diversity
| Low-income (Note: The percentage of students who received an income-based federal Pell grant intended for low-income students.) | 35% |
| Affluent (Note: The percentage of students who are a part of the American middle class at the bare minimum.) | 65% |

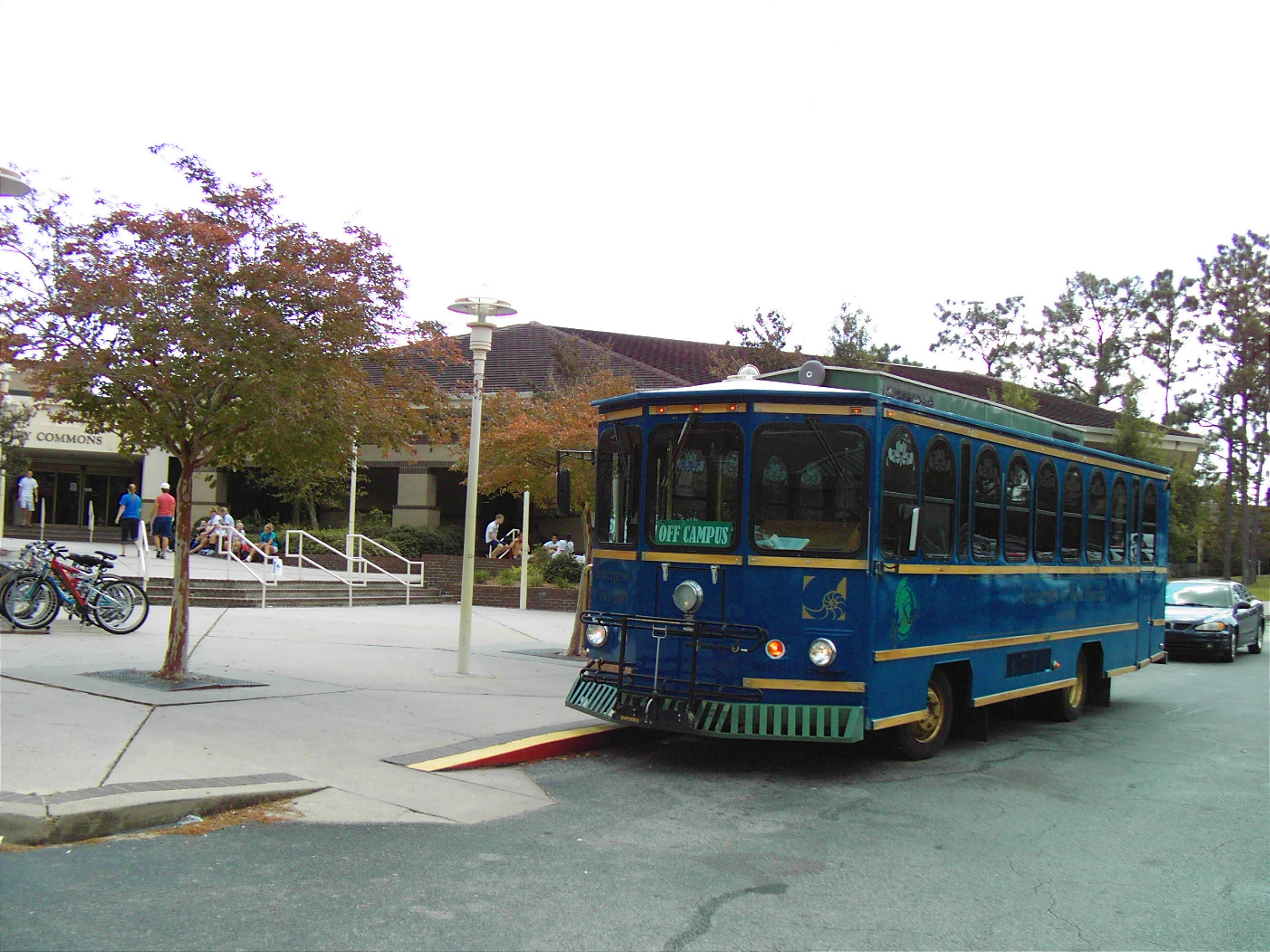
The UWF trolley system is an important mode of transportation for many students.

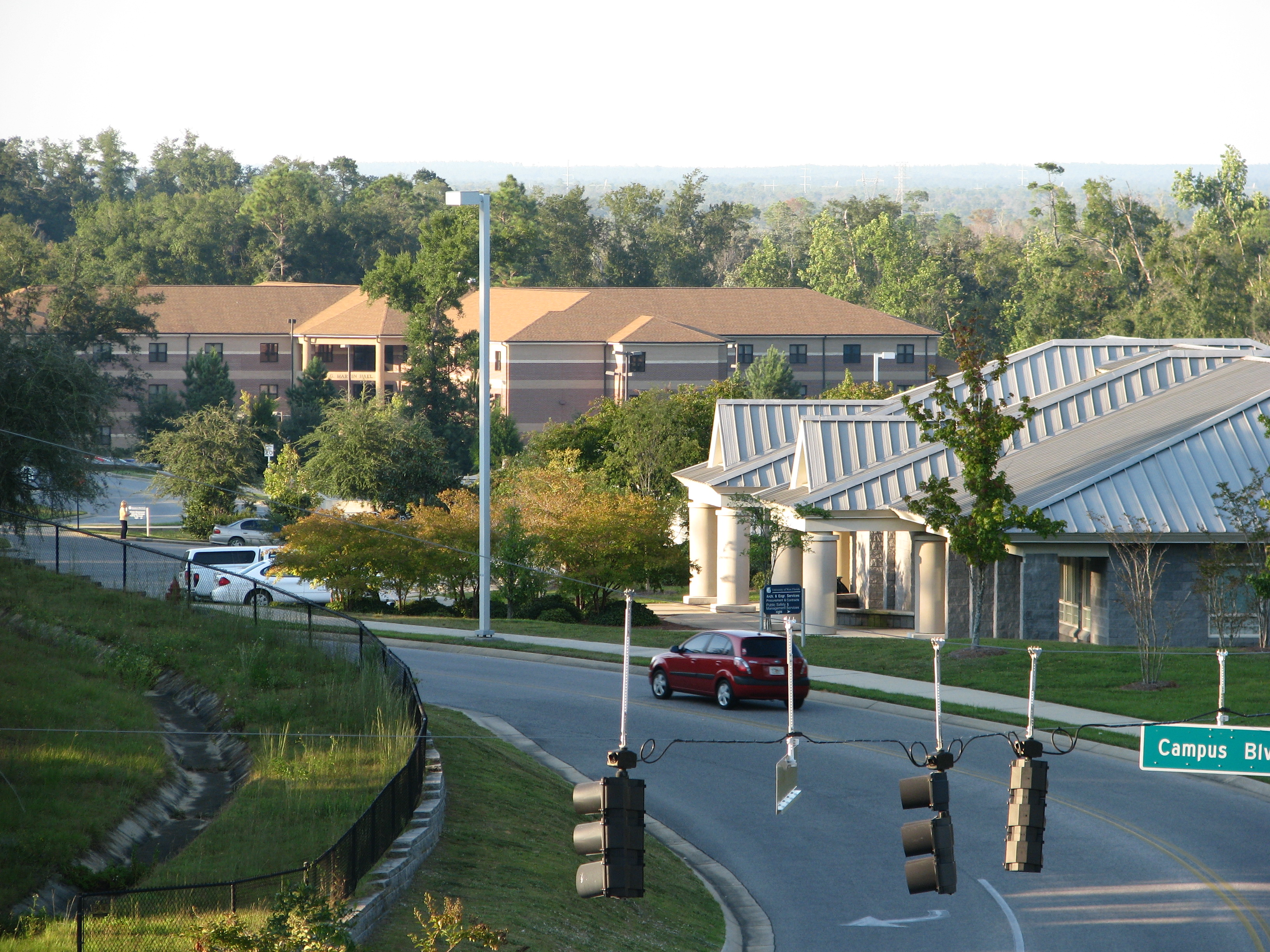
A view of Martin Hall from Village East

Currently, UWF enrolls more than 14,000 students between undergraduate and graduate programs across its colleges. UWF has conferred more than 100,000 associate, bachelor's, master's, specialist and doctoral degrees.

UWF hosts many opportunities for involvement through student clubs and organizations. Registered student organizations, administered by Student Involvement, include academic clubs, Greek organizations, professional and honor societies, religious organizations and special interest groups. Additionally, UWF owns property on Pensacola Beach, frequently used by students for research and recreation. UWF also offers numerous on-campus mountain bike trails to students free of charge, in addition to a wide variety of recreational activities.

=== Housing ===
UWF offers traditional residence halls, small community residence halls and university-owned apartment complexes. The university also offers living learning communities, which provide signature programming and academic support to residents.

=== Greek life ===
There are sixteen fraternities and sororities on campus. These chapters include over 500 members.

=== Transportation ===
UWF offers a trolley service and public bicycles around campus known as "yellow bikes". There is parking for all visitors, students and employees. The Escambia County Area Transit bus system also offers students a discount rate.

== Athletics ==
West Florida athletic teams are the Argonauts. The university is a member of the Division II level of the National Collegiate Athletic Association (NCAA), primarily competing in the Gulf South Conference (GSC) since the 1994–95 academic year. The Argonauts previously competed in the Southern States Conference of the National Association of Intercollegiate Athletics (NAIA) from 1974–75 to 1993–94, with a brief hiatus of dropping its athletics program from 1976–77 to 1979–80.

West Florida competes in 15 intercollegiate varsity sports: Men's sports include baseball, basketball, cross country, football, golf, soccer and tennis; while women's sports include basketball, cross country, golf, soccer, softball, swimming and diving, tennis and volleyball.

=== Accomplishments ===
UWF's athletic program has won eleven national championships, with the most recent being men's golf in 2025. In 2019, football won the NCAA Division II Championship; as well as winning a women's tennis GSC championship for the 19th time, making that its 100th conference championship in school history.

=== Football ===
In 2015, the university welcomed its first football team on campus and held intra-team scrimmages throughout the fall. In 2016, UWF hosted its inaugural season, kicking off with a 45–0 win against Ave Maria University.

In 2017, the football program qualified for the NCAA Division II playoffs in just its second season. The team reached the championship game, losing to Texas A&M-Commerce, 37–27, in just the 26th game in school history.

In 2019, UWF's football program won the NCAA Division II national championship in its fourth season, winning against Minnesota State University, 48–40.

== Notable people ==
UWF alumni include six NASA astronauts, as well as graduates who have served as leaders in the military, government, STEM, and executive fields.

Notable West Florida alumni include:

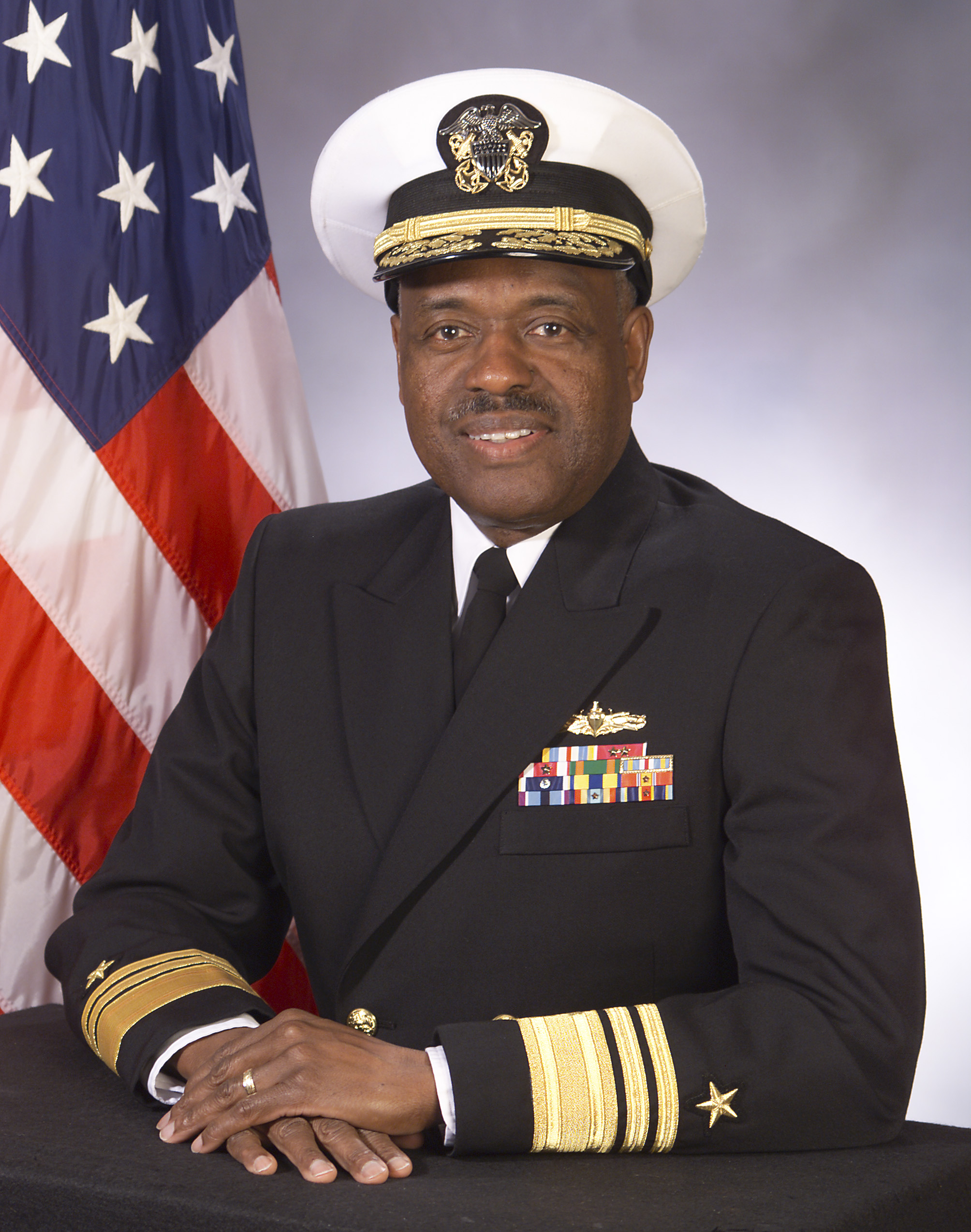
David L. Brewer III
former superintendent of the LA School District; retired Vice admiral, U.S. Navy

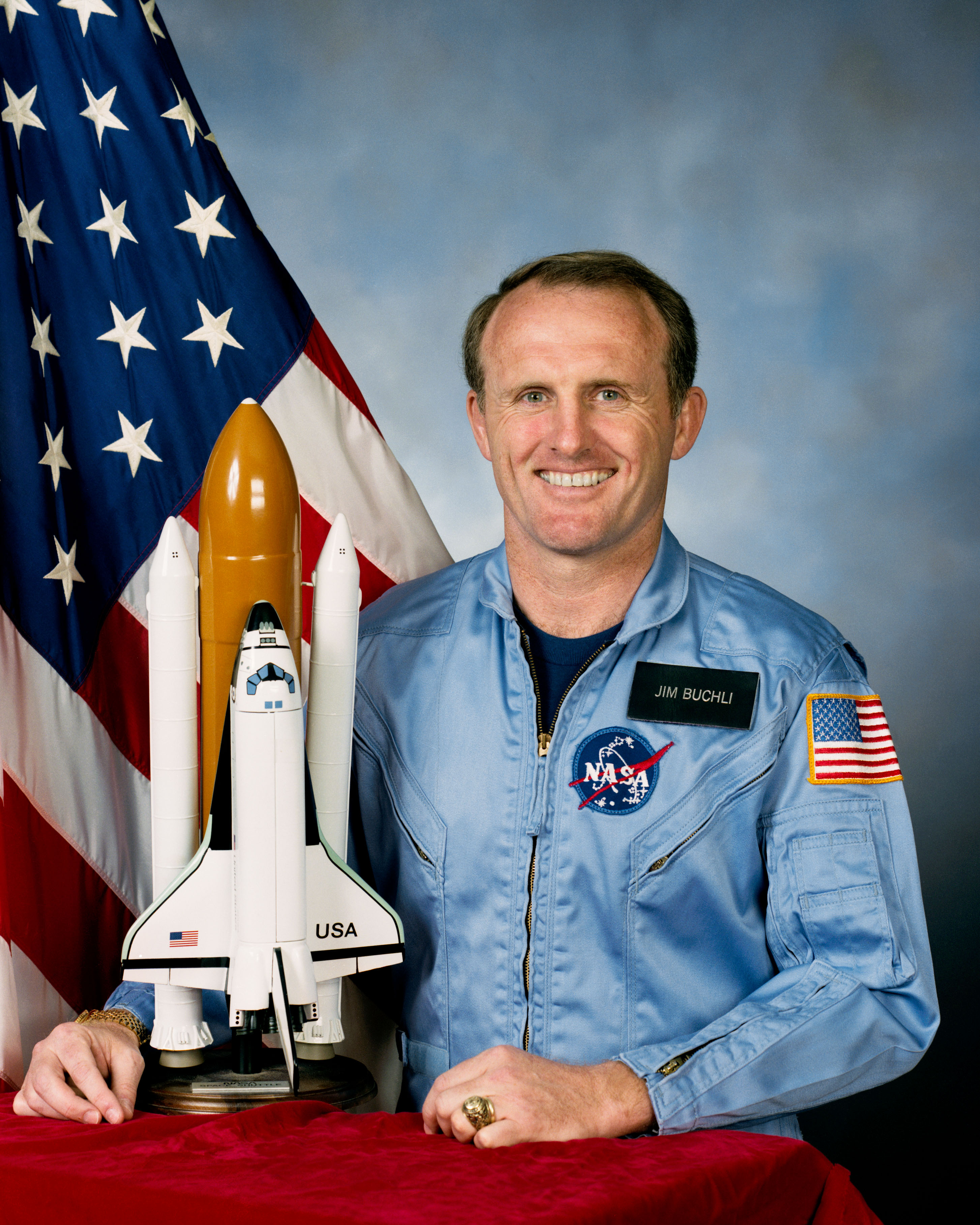
James Buchli
NASA astronaut
(STS-51-C, STS-61-A, STS-29, STS-48)

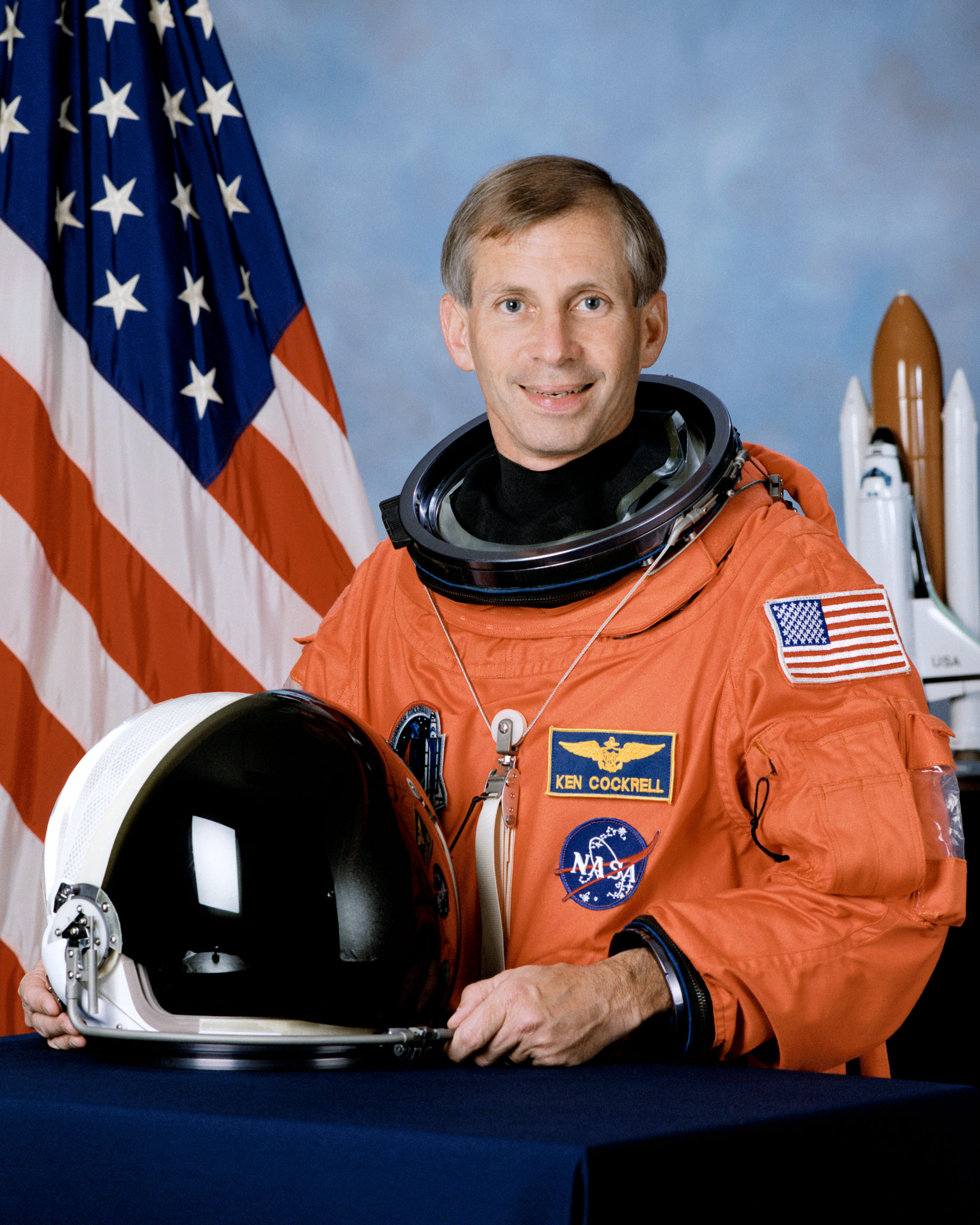
Kenneth Cockrell
NASA astronaut
(9th Chief of the Astronaut Office)

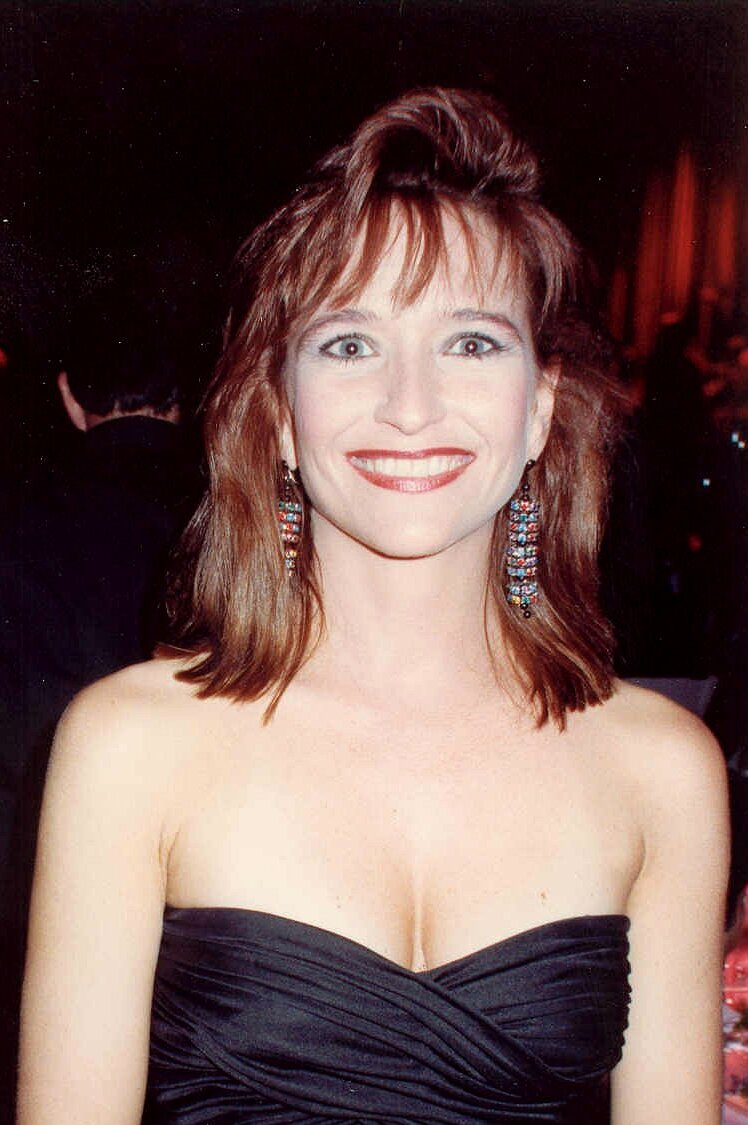
Jan Hooks
Actress and comedian

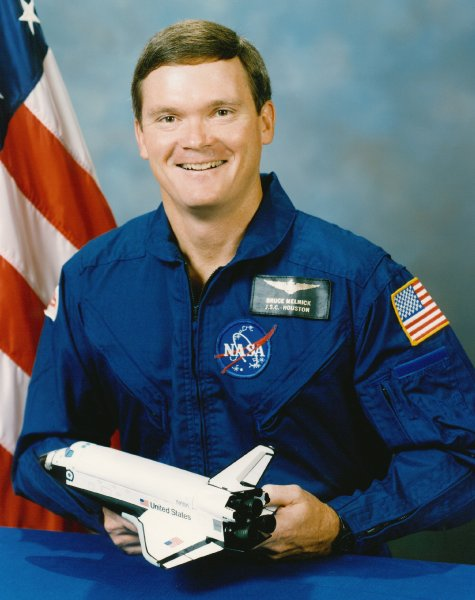
Bruce Melnick
NASA astronaut
(STS-41, STS-49)

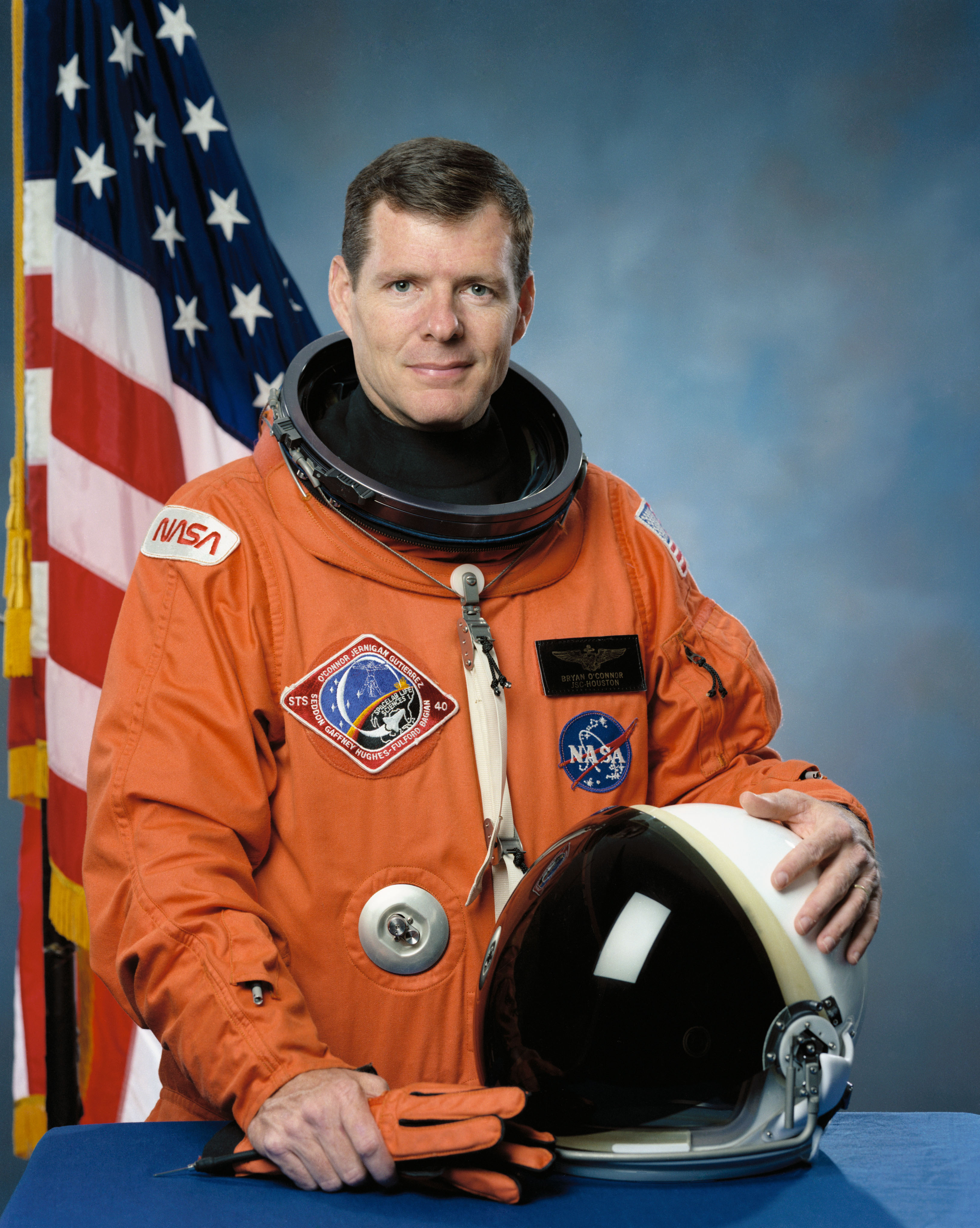
Bryan D. O'Connor
NASA astronaut
(STS-61-B, STS-40)

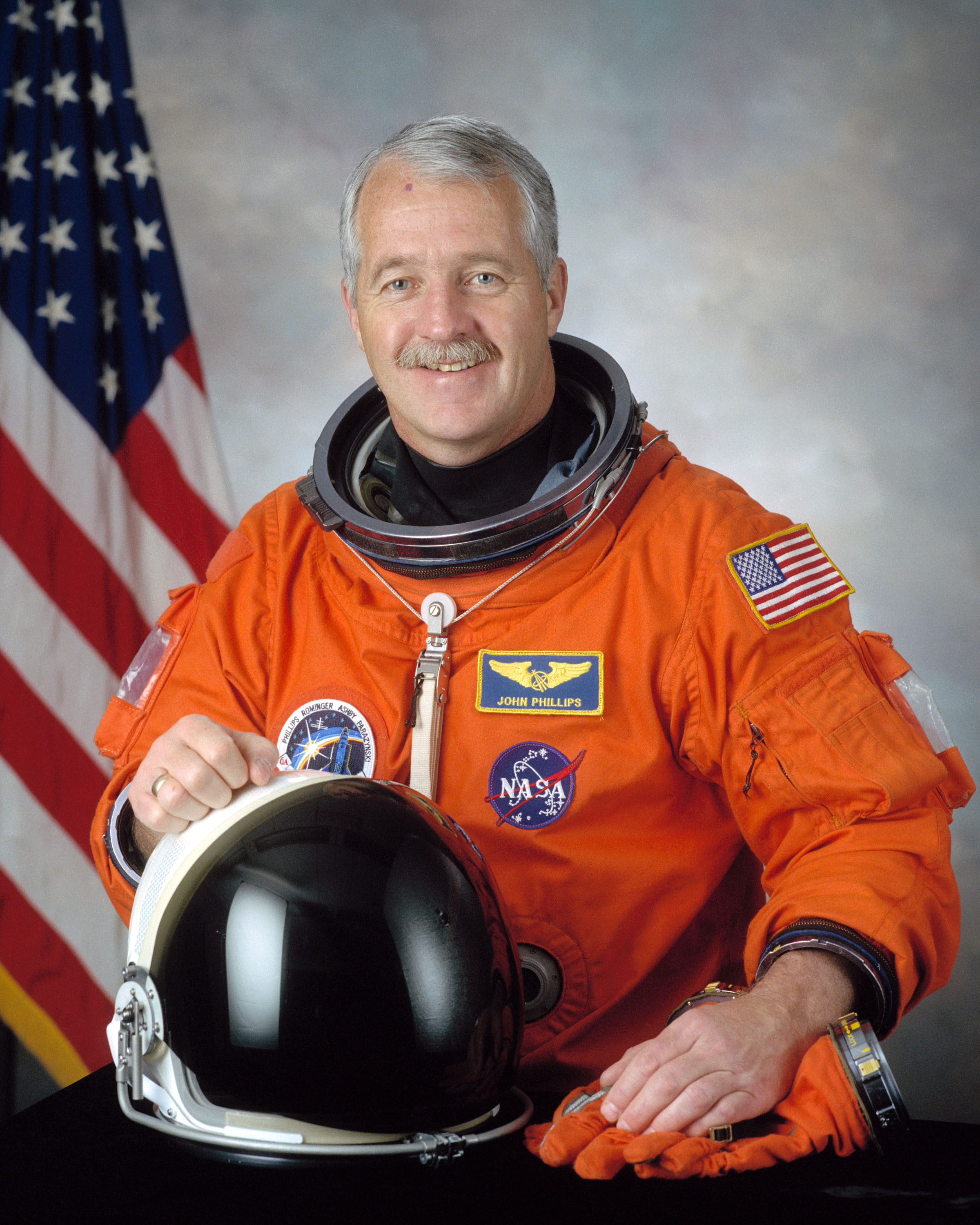
John L. Phillips
NASA astronaut
(STS-100, Expedition 11, STS-119)

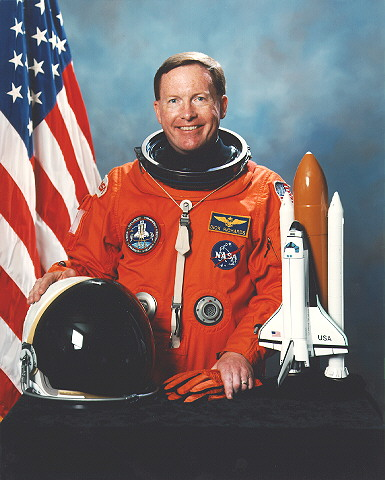
Richard N. Richards
NASA astronaut
(STS-28, STS-41, STS-50, STS-64)

== See also ==
- John C. Pace Library
