= Francisco San Maxent =

Spanish colonial official

6th Governor of West Florida
- In office March 1809 – May 1809
- Preceded by: Vicente Folch y Juan
- Succeeded by: Vicente Folch y Juan

8th Governor of West Florida
- In office December 1809 – October 1810
- Preceded by: Vicente Folch y Juan
- Succeeded by: Francisco Collell

10th Governor of West Florida
- In office April 1811 – June 1812
- Preceded by: Francisco Collell
- Succeeded by: Mauricio de Zúñiga

15th Governor of West Florida
- In office September 1816 – November 1816
- Preceded by: Mauricio de Zúñiga
- Succeeded by: José Fascot

Personal details
- Born: April 22, 1761 New Orleans, Louisiana
- Died: November 25, 1825 (aged 64) Cuba
- Profession: Colonial administrator and commander of the Spanish presidio of Mobile, Alabama

Francisco Maximiliano de San Maxent La Roche (April 22, 1761 - November 25, 1825) was the interim governor of West Florida. He served four stints in the office of governor. He also commanded the Spanish forces in Mobile (1805-1807 and in 1811).

== Biography ==
Maximilien François de Saint-Maxent was born in New Orleans, Louisiana, to Gilbert Antoine de St. Maxent and Elizabeth LaRoche. He was the fourth of nine siblings.

Saint Maxent joined the Spanish army as a young man. On May 4, 1795 whilst holding the rank of Captain, he was appointed as the commanding officer of the Third Battalion, Louisiana Fixed Infantry Regiment.

He was appointed commandant of Mobile on 16 July 1805. In 1807, while commanding Mobile, he got into a dispute with American commander Edmund P. Gaines at Fort Stoddert. San Maxent was commandant of Mobile until 30 August 1807. During 1807, he was promoted to Lieutenant Colonel.

In March 1809 he was appointed governor of Florida on an interim basis. He held the post for only two months and was removed in May of the same year. After a short period of governorship by Colonel Vicente Folch y Juan, Saint Maxent resumed the interim government of Florida in December 1809 and remained in office until October 1810. Shortly afterwards he returned to the post of commandant of Mobile, but he was replaced on 23 March 1811.

Just the following month Saint Maxent was appointed governor of Florida for the third time and he remained in office until June 1812. In 1814 he was promoted to Colonel and became the commanding officer of the Louisiana Fixed Infantry Regiment. In September 1816, he was appointed governor of Florida for the fourth time. However, like the first time he governed Florida, he held the office for only two months, as he was removed from office in November of that year. In 1817, he continued to be the commanding officer of the regiment, and was promoted to Brigadier General.

He died in Cuba in 1825.

== Personal life and legacy ==
San Maxent married Maria Irene Folch on 20 March 1805. She was the daughter of Vicente Folch, who preceded him as governor. Letters to and from him survive.

== See also ==
- List of colonial governors of Florida
