= William King (West Florida governor) =

American governor, West Florida (d. 1926)

16th Governor of West Florida
- In office 26 May 1818 – 4 February 1819
- Preceded by: José Masot
- Succeeded by: José María Callava

Personal details
- Born: Unknown Delaware
- Died: January 1, 1826 Mobile County, Alabama
- Profession: Military and Political

William King (died January 1, 1826) was an American army officer who was military governor of West Florida from May 26, 1818 to February 4, 1819. He was appointed to the position by Andrew Jackson, who led the American occupation of Spanish West Florida during the First Seminole War.

== Biography ==
William King was born in Delaware in the late 18th century. He was commissioned as a second lieutenant of the United States Army in May 1808. In February 1812 he was sent by Lt. Col. Zebulon Montgomery Pike to negotiate with the Spanish commander Bernardo Montero about a joint U.S.–Spanish mission to clear "banditti" out of the Neutral Ground around the Sabine River; Montero declined as he said he was not authorized for such a campaign.

King served in the War of 1812. King was promoted to colonel in 1813.

King wrote to Daniel Parker in August 1817 asking if it was true that a war against the Seminoles was impending; according to historian Samuel J. Watson, "his main concern was that it be conducted after the hot season to minimize casualties to disease." King was a man of the Jacksonian school in that he advocated that invasion by the Americans, whether the site of invasion be Texas or Florida, prevented "ineffectual Spanish rule" from being replaced by "Indian war, illegal slave trading...or freebooters preying on American commerce." The Georgia Patriots who sought to liberate Florida for the benefit of the United States wrote to him in 1817 asking him for weapons. King replied that such action by the Georgians would be unlikely to meet "the approbation of my superiors" but he simultaneously argued that to "permit the Star Spangled Banner to wave o'er the works of the Barrancas & St. Augustine & the Troops of the U.S. to occupy those post subject to the further arrangements of the two governments." Per Watson on extracurricular filibustering by the U.S. Army during this period, "Even though he sympathized with Jesup, encouraged Gaines, and ordered to concentrate the Fourth Infantry Regiment where it could join the Seventh 'towards' Pensacola, Jackson wanted to avoid upsetting President-elect Monroe, whom he expected to support future expansionist action."

He led the 4th Infantry Regiment under Andrew Jackson during the First Seminole War. He was with Jackson during his controversial 1818 invasion of the Spanish colony of West Florida and the occupation of Pensacola.

According to a directory of officers published 1818, he was colonel commanding the 8th department of Alabama, stationed at Pensacola.

Following Governor José Masot's surrender on May 23, Jackson appointed King military governor of West Florida on May 26. Jackson interpreted Masot's terms of surrender as giving the United States control over the entirety of West Florida.

As military governor, King was charged with upholding Spanish law in the colony, overseeing Spanish property, and caring for soldiers wounded in Jackson's campaign. After Jackson's departure from Florida on May 29, he also oversaw the dispersal of the Tennessee and Kentucky militia. However, Jackson's invasion of Florida threatened to derail the Adams–Onís Treaty, by which the United States hoped to acquire Spanish Florida, and the James Monroe administration wanted West Florida restored to Spanish control. King served in his post until he was relieved by Edmund P. Gaines on orders from U.S. Secretary of War John C. Calhoun. He was succeeded by José María Callava, West Florida's final Spanish governor.

King was court-martialled, at Montpelier, Alabama, around February 1820 by judge advocate Stockley D. Hays and "suspended from all rank, pay and emoluments for the space of five years." The editors of the Papers of Andrew Jackson have it that " Jackson had left [King] in command of American forces at Pensacola in 1818, [he] had been court-martialed and convicted in 1819 for shooting deserters and suspended from the army for five years."

In October 1821 Jackson wrote to James Monroe encouraging him to reappoint King, writing, "I bring him to the view of the Government, as a proper person for this appointment-I mean Col Wm King late of the 4 Regt U. S. Infy-A man whose service, whilst under my command, I hold in fresh recollection, and whom I believe innocent of any military offence worthy of the degradation awarded him; and on this belief, for justice and his familie's sake, I now name him, when the opportunity is good, for the Government to restore him to that confidence and standing in society which he is entitled to."

The Army Register states that King was honorably discharged from the Army in June 1821, and died in January 1826. Obituaries published in New Orleans papers reported that he died at his home near Mobile, Alabama, on January 1, 1826, and was buried in Mobile with military honors on January 2.

Fort King, constructed in 1827, was named in honor of King.

== Sources ==
- Heidler, David Stephen; Heidler, Jeanne T. (2003). Old Hickory's War: Andrew Jackson and the Quest for Empire. Louisiana State University Press. ISBN 0-8071-2867-8.
- Jackson, Andrew (1996). Moser, Harold; Hoth, David; Hoemann, George (eds.). The Papers of Andrew Jackson: Volume V, 1821–1824. University of Tennessee Press. doi:10.7290/utp7345. ISBN 978-0-87049-897-8.
- Ott, Eloise R. (1967). "Fort King: A Brief History". The Florida Historical Quarterly. 46 (1): 29–38.
- Watson, Samuel J. (2012). Jackson's Sword: The Army Officer Corps on the American Frontier, 1810–1821. Modern War Studies. Lawrence: University Press of Kansas. ISBN 978-0-7006-1884-2. LCCN 2012027879. OCLC 788282695.
