= José Masot =

Governor of West Florida

15th Governor of West Florida
- In office March 8, 1816 – May 26, 1818
- Preceded by: Francisco San Maxent
- Succeeded by: William King

Personal details
- Born: late 18th century and early 19th century Unknown
- Died: Unknown Unknown
- Profession: Soldier and Politician

Military service
- Allegiance: Spain
- Branch/service: Spanish Navy
- Rank: Colonel
- Battles/wars: First Seminole War

José Masot (Spanish: José Masot), also known as José Fascot, was a senior officer of the Spanish Navy who served as governor of West Florida, subdelegate of the intendant, and superintendent general for an island in the Escambia river, from March 1816 until his deposition in May 1818 by American general Andrew Jackson.

== Military and political career ==
Jose Masot joined the Spanish Navy in his youth and eventually rose to the rank of colonel. Masot, appointed governor of West Florida on March 8, 1816, dealt severely with a slave uprising.

=== First Seminole War ===
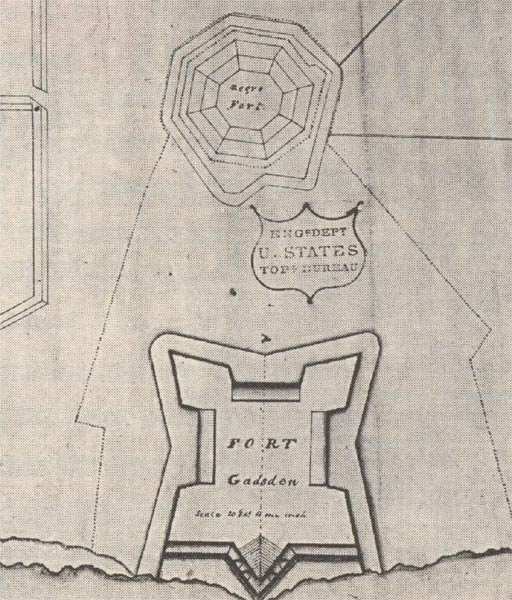
Fort Gadsden and the "negro fort."

Masot was the Governor of West Florida at the outbreak of The First Seminole War. After the garrison at the negro fort killed a group of American sailors, General Jackson decided to destroy it. In April 1816, Jackson informed him that if the Spanish did not eliminate the negro fort, he would. Masot replied that he did not have sufficient forces to take the fort. Jackson then assigned Brigadier General Edmund P. Gaines to the task.

In July 1816, a supply fleet for Fort Scott reached the Apalachicola River. Colonel Duncan Lamont Clinch took a force of more than 100 American soldiers and about 150 Lower Creek warriors, including the chief Tustunnugee Hutkee (White Warrior), to protect their passage. The supply fleet met Clinch at the negro fort, and its two gunboats took positions across the river from the fort. The men in the fort fired their cannon at their opponents, but had no training in aiming the weapon. The Americans fired back and destroyed the fort. Of the 320 people known to be in the fort, which included women and children, more than 250 died during the assault with many others succumbing to their injuries soon after. Once the fort was destroyed, the US army withdrew from Spanish Florida.

Masot's time as governor of West Florida came to an end the following year. On November 11, 1817, several officers and cadets of the Louisiana Fixed Infantry Regiment met at the home of Lieutenant Henry Grandpre in Pensacola. The meeting was to discuss killing Masot and installing either Commander Luis Piernas or Artillery Colonel Diego Vera in his place. The plot was discovered and Masot was able to send the news of what happened to the Captain General of Cuba (in the Spanish empire, the Floridas were governed administratively by Cuba), who had suspicions of a relationship between the conspirators and the American troops that had entered the territory of Apalachicola and whose number was estimated at nearly 4,000 men.

On May 24, 1818, the Americans occupied the square of Florida's capital, Pensacola, and, after a confrontation with gunfire (which lasted several days), Masot formally surrendered to the armed forces of the United States on May 28. Capturing Pensacola was the last stage of Jackson's campaign, and he, interpreting Masot's terms of surrender as giving the United States control over the entirety of West Florida, appointed Colonel William King as its provisional governor, and he and his troops returned to U.S. territory.
