= Francisco de Paula Gelabert =

Governor of West Florida

Francisco José de Paula Gelabert (1758 – after June 21, 1832) was an honorary commissioner of War who was Royal Governor of West Florida between May and September, 1796.

Paula Gelabert was born in Madrid, Spain, sometime in the 18th century. He was son of Antonio de Paula Gelabert and Rosa Estrani. His parents were natives from Barcelona and Vich (Catalonia, Spain) respectively. His father was descended from an ancient and noble lineage from Catalonia. Francisco José de Paula Gelabert was an honorary War Commissioner who, in May 1796, was appointed Royal Governor of West Florida, office he occupied until September this year.

He was married Maria Coleta Hore Piña, with whom he had two children: Antonio (born June 17, 1814) and María Angela (born February 28, 1821), and one granddaughter: María Concepción (born in 1848). He, after being widowed, remarried on June 21, 1832, with María Ignacia Correa, native from Palencia (Spain).

Gelabert died after June 21, 1832.

Please check previous data

Draft:

Francisco de Paula Gelabert y Albiñana (1752 Orihuela, Alicante - 17-07-1805 La Habana, Capitanía General de Cuba) Interim governor of West Florida between May and September 1796. Army Brigadier, Engineer Colonel and Chief Engineer

Many of his plans as an engineer in the Floridas can be seen in the following links

Pensacola

San Marcos de Apalache Fort Florida State Park in Wakulla County,

https://bibliotecavirtual.defensa.gob.es/BVMDefensa/i18n/consulta/resultados_ocr.do?id=22456&tipoResultados=BIB&posicion=2&forma=ficha

https://bibliotecavirtual.defensa.gob.es/BVMDefensa/i18n/consulta/resultados_ocr.do?id=22456&tipoResultados=BIB&posicion=1&forma=ficha

https://bibliotecavirtual.defensa.gob.es/BVMDefensa/i18n/consulta/resultados_ocr.do?id=22456&tipoResultados=BIB&posicion=3&forma=ficha

https://rla.unc.edu/emas/Ultramar.html
