= John Eliot (Royal Navy officer) =

Captain John Eliot
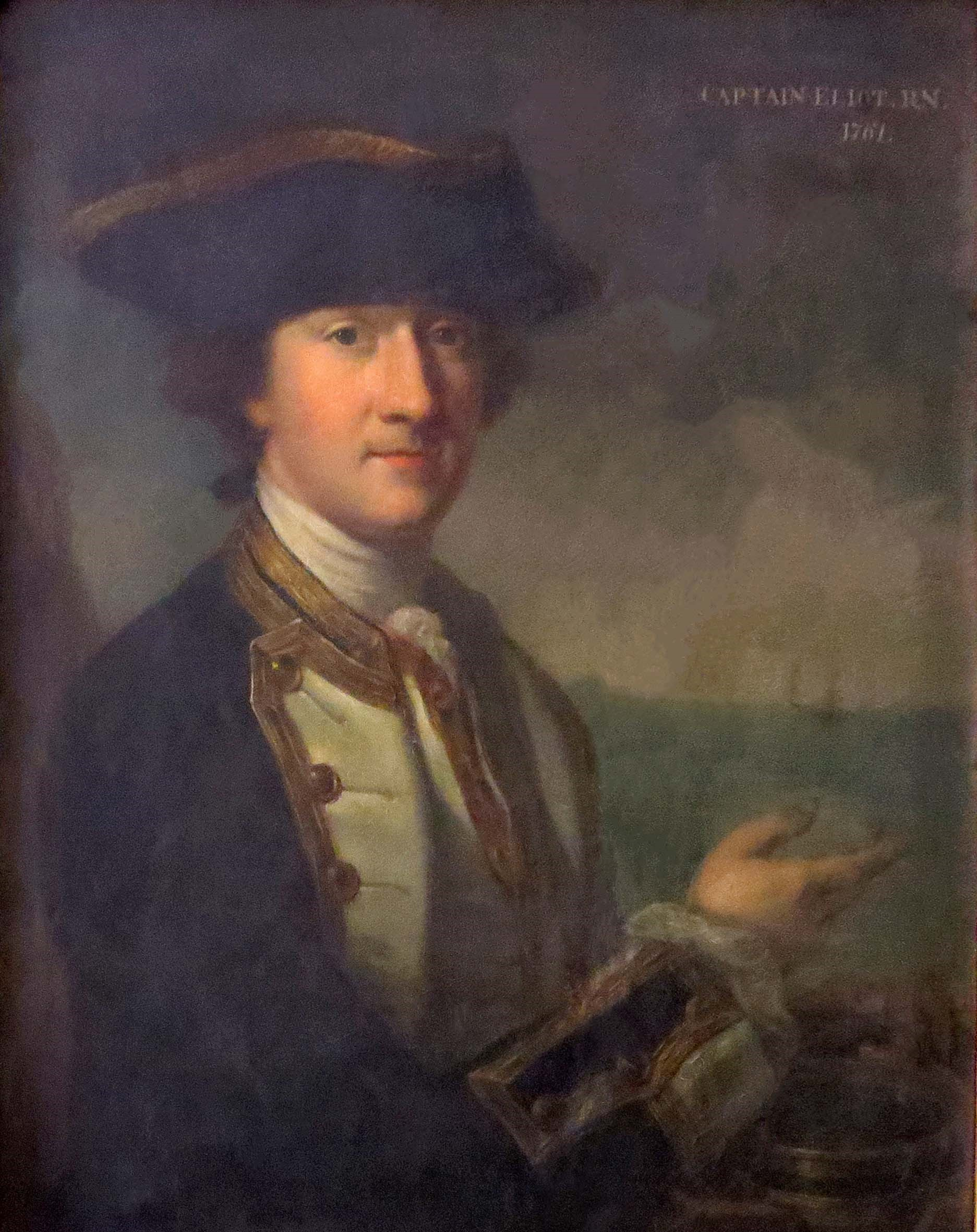
- Captain John Eliot in uniform, 1761

5th Governor of British West Florida
- In office 2 Apr 1769 – 2 May 1769
- Preceded by: Montfort Browne
- Succeeded by: Elias Durnford

Personal details
- Born: 2 June 1742 Port Eliot, Cornwall, England
- Died: 2 May 1769 (aged 26) Pensacola, Florida
- Profession: Royal Navy officer and Governor

John Eliot (2 June 1742 – 2 May 1769) was a Royal Navy captain. He was appointed Governor of West Florida in 1767 and committed suicide in 1769, shortly after his arrival in Pensacola.

== Life ==
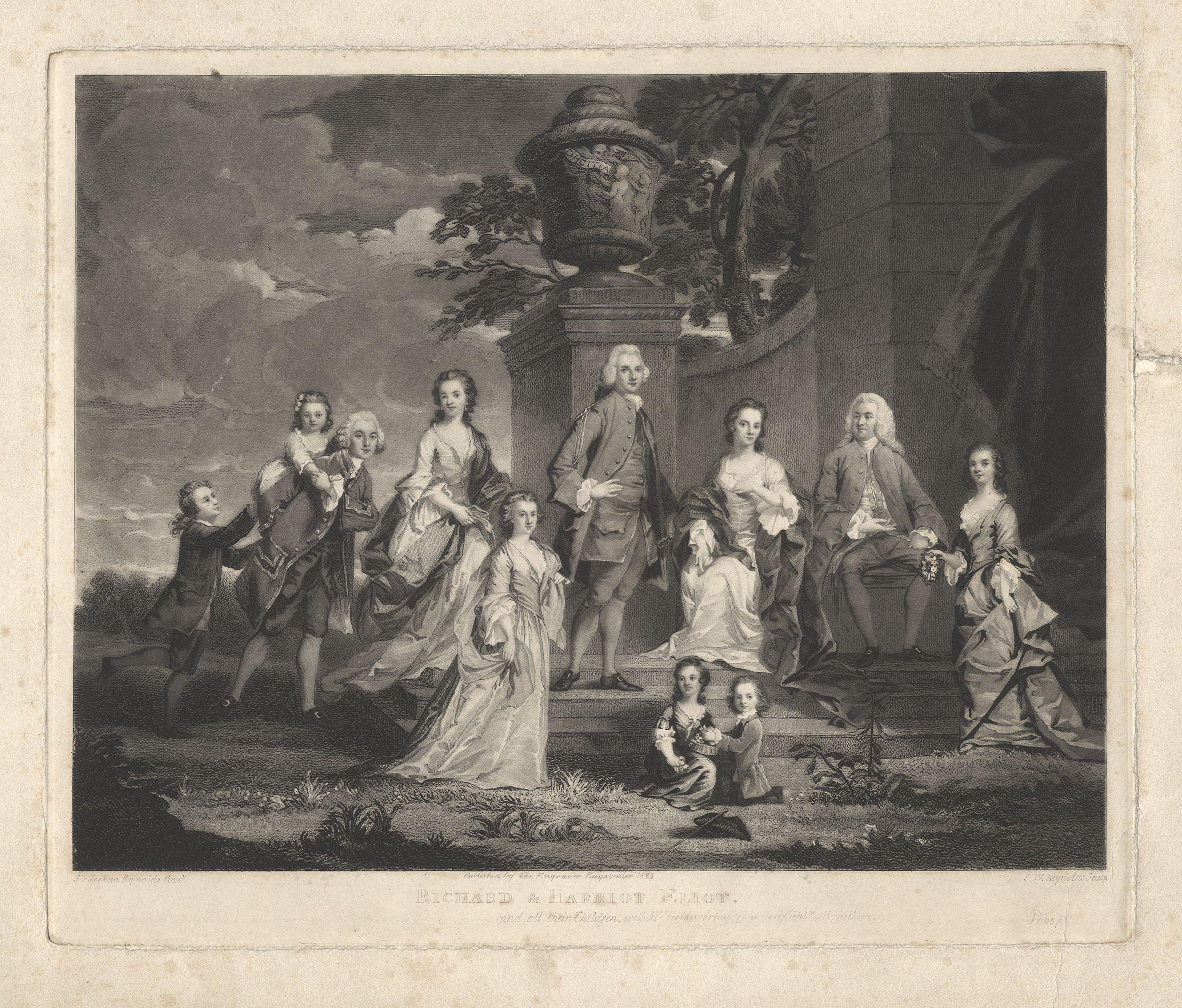
Portrait of the family of Richard Eliot. John Eliot is one of the children in this engraving. Eliot's stepfather John Hamilton is also depicted.

John Eliot was born 2 June 1742 in Port Eliot, Cornwall, England to Richard and Harriet Craggs Eliot. His father was an important local politician, and his grandfather had served in the Royal Navy. His father died in 1748, and his mother afterward married John Hamilton, a navy captain.

== Naval career ==
Eliot joined the Royal Navy in 1752 as a midshipman aboard HMS Penzance. In 1753 command of Penzance was given to Eliot's brother in law, Hugh Bonfoy, and Eliot again served as a midshipman on his cruise to Newfoundland. He first saw action with the Channel fleet in 1756, during the Seven Years' War as a midshipman aboard HMS Vanguard under John Byron. In 1757 he transferred to HMS Marlborough (flagship of Admiral Thomas Cotes), which cruised to Jamaica but saw no action due to her poor sailing characteristics. Seeking action, Eliot transferred to HMS Augusta as third lieutenant. Her first lieutenant was George Johnstone, who would also figure in the history of West Florida.

Augusta's captain, Arthur Forrest, was an aggressive tactician, and Eliot repeatedly saw action under Forrest's command. During the first six months of 1758 Forrest raided French shipping in the Caribbean, taking numerous prizes. In June 1758 Eliot transferred to HMS Viper. He cruised with her until January 1759, when he was temporarily given her command after her captain succumbed to a tropical fever. This command was brief (lasting just under one month) before a new captain was assigned to the ship. In April 1759 Eliot returned to England aboard HMS Hornet.

During this early service Eliot's family continued to forge connections at the highest levels of the Admiralty. His brother Edward, serving in Parliament, worked to advance his career, and his sister Elizabeth married Charles Cocks, who was connected by marriage to Admiral George Anson. By the time Eliot returned to England Anson had arranged for the young lieutenant's first command, the 12-gun sloop Hawke. On 4 September 1759 Eliot was commissioned a commander, and by the end of the month he was aboard Hawke at Plymouth, preparing her for sea.

Surviving records of Hawke's cruise are sketchy. On 9 December she was engaged in a brief battle with a much larger French privateer. Suffering three killed in the exchange, Eliot was compelled to strike her colours. Taken captive to France, Eliot was quickly exchanged through the intercession of his family. An inquiry was held in April 1760 investigating the loss of the ship, in which Eliot and his officers were acquitted of any wrongdoing. The ship's surgeon testified that Eliot "behaved with great calmness and resolution" during the incident.

On 25 April 1760 Eliot, not yet eighteen, was commissioned a captain, given command of HMS Gosport, and assigned to convoy duty to the Baltic Sea. On the return leg of his second voyage, Eliot used tactics learned from Captain Forrest to capture a French privateer, recovering two of its British prizes in the process. With his next command, HMS Thames, Eliot saw duty in home waters and on the blockade of the French coast, landing a rich prize ship loaded with coffee. In April 1762 Eliot received secret orders to cruise in search of French privateers between the Canary Islands and the Azores, an area where British warships were not normally active. This duty was without significant incident, and he returned to Plymouth in January 1763.

With the advent of peace, Eliot, still aboard Thames, was assigned duty with the Mediterranean squadron. He was involved in a minor diplomatic incident while calling on the Spanish port of Cádiz, when one of his junior officers incorrectly responded to salutes fired by Spanish naval vessels entering the harbour. While transporting Henry Grenville, the ambassador to the Ottoman Empire, back to England in late 1765, Thames was found to be leaking badly, and Eliot was forced to put in at Toulon for repairs. While there he encountered James Boswell, who wrote favourably of the young captain. His return to England afterward was complicated by a quarantine imposed on the ship because of the ambassador's baggage; Eliot's family connections were instrumental in rapidly getting the ship released.

== Governor of West Florida ==
Eliot was next posted to HMS Firm, performing guard patrol around Plymouth. He was on this duty in early 1767 when political circumstances resulted in his appointment as governor of West Florida. George Johnstone, his shipmate from Augusta, had been appointed the colony's first governor, and had been recalled in early 1767. More senior naval officers were considered to replace Johnstone, but were deemed unlikely to accept the post. Eliot's brother Edward had been appointed to the Board of Trade, whose head was his uncle, Robert Nugent. The influence of his brother and uncle with Parliament was also significant, and their work resulted in the appointment of Eliot, a 24-year-old officer who had never commanded a ship of the line, as governor in March 1767.

In part because of political turmoil, Eliot did not immediately depart for Pensacola. Finally sailing on 6 January 1769, Eliot landed at Pensacola on 2 April. During the crossing, Eliot was reportedly afflicted with significant pains in his head, and some of his writings from the time show signs of deteriorating handwriting. The pains had apparently dissipated by the time of his arrival at Pensacola, but they soon returned. On the evening of 1 May, Eliot dined with Lieutenant Governor Montfort Browne. The next morning his body was found hanging in the study of the governor's house. Some reports incorrectly stated that he had died of an apoplectic fit, or suggested that his suicide was the result of a melancholic fit. Biographer Robert Rea believes he probably suffered from a brain tumour, whose effects drove him to suicide.

Eliot was buried outside the Pensacola fort with military honours. The only major action begun during his brief time in office was to institute legal proceedings against Lieutenant Governor Browne on charges that he had misappropriated colonial funds. Because of these charges, Browne was eventually supplanted by Elias Durnford as lieutenant governor.

Preceded by Montfort Browne (acting)	Governor of British West Florida; 1769	Succeeded by Captain-Lieutenant Elias Durnford (acting)
