= Elias Walker Durnford =

British Army general

Major-General Elias Walker Durnford
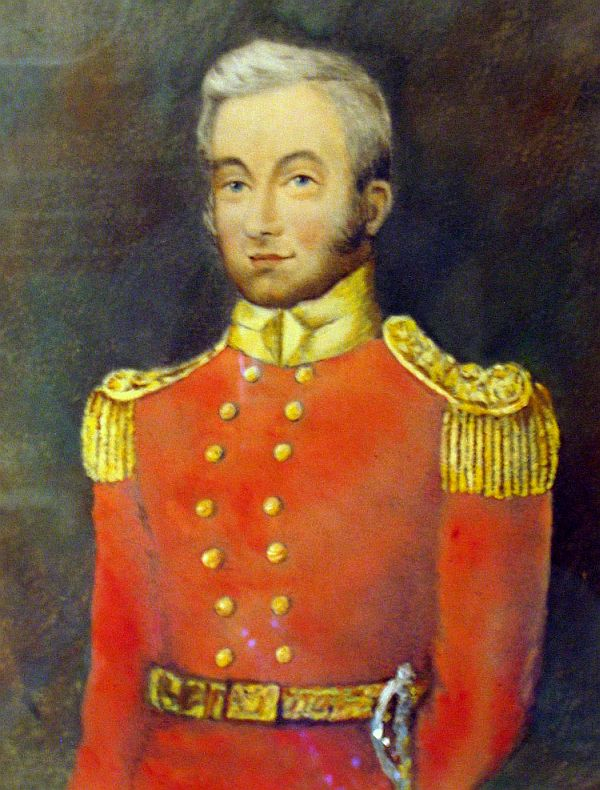
- Born: 28 July 1774; Lowestoft, Suffolk, England
- Died: 8 March 1850 (aged 75) Tunbridge Wells, Kent, England

Major-General Elias Walker Durnford (28 July 1774 – 8 March 1850) was the builder of the Citadel, Quebec City.

Durnford was born in 1774 in Lowestoft, Suffolk to British Army officer Elias Durnford and Rebecca Walker. He was commissioned as a Second Lieutenant in the Corps of Royal Engineers on 24 April 1793. Durnford married Jane Sophia Mann on 30 October 1798. On 10 January 1837 he removed from the Corps, on being promoted to the rank of major general. Major General Elias Walker Durnford R.E. died in 1850 in Clarence Villa, Tunbridge Wells, Kent, at the age of 75.
