= Elias Durnford =

18th-century British army officer, civil engineer, and colonial official

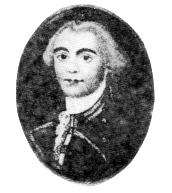

6th Governor of British West Florida
- In office Nov 1769 – 10 Aug 1770
- Preceded by: John Eliot
- Succeeded by: Peter Chester

Personal details
- Born: 13 June 1739 Ringwood, Hampshire, England
- Died: 21 June 1794 (aged 55) Tobago
- Spouse: Rebecca Walker
- Children: Elias Walker Durnford
- Profession: Military officer, governor, artist

Elias Durnford (13 June 1739 – 21 June 1794) was a British army officer and civil engineer who is best known for surveying the town of Pensacola, Florida, U.S. and laying out a city plan centered of two public areas now called the Plaza Ferdinand VII and the Seville Square.

Between 1769 and 1778 Durnford was Lieutenant Governor of British West Florida and by 1794 was a colonel Chief Royal Engineer of the West Indies.

== Early life ==
Elias Durnford was born in Ringwood, Hampshire, England on 13 June 1739.

== Military Service ==
Durnford served as an Ensign in the British army Corps of Royal Engineers, having signed up on 17 March 1759. In the Seven Years' War he participated in the Capture of Belle Île, France, 1761 and was also at the Battle of Havana (1762). After the Cuban action Lord Albemarle made him an Aide-de-camp. Durnford became an accomplished artist while on the Cuban campaign, and engravings made from his sketches are highly valued.

After the Seven Years' War Durnford was posted to the newly established British colony of West Florida, where he was appointed chief engineer and surveyor general. To supplement his small salary he was paid for land surveying. As the colony was being divided into land grants he profited greatly from this arrangement.

Durnford laid out the city plan for Pensacola after arriving there in 1764. His plan for the city was classic in nature, centered on two squares, one for government and one for military drill and public affairs. Streets were all surveyed at right angles named after royal family members and government representatives. He included in the housing plan gardening plots on the north side of the city along Garden Street,

Durnford's own estate was 52,662 acres (213.12 km^{2}), including his 5,000-acre (20 km^{2}) plantation, named Belle Fontaine, which was located atop the eastern cliffs above Mobile Bay. The location was also home to a military convalescent hospital, named Crofton. He designed a new port for the area, but the plan was never put into action. His design for a road to link Mobile to the colony's capital, Pensacola was more successful and was partly completed.

When the Governor of West Florida, John Eliot, hanged himself in 1769, Durnford was named Lieutenant Governor of the colony. After getting married in England, Durnford returned to West Florida and was appointed Acting Governor until the new governor, Peter Chester, arrived on 10 August 1770. Durnford remained as Lieutenant Governor and was a member of the West Florida Council until 1778.

Durnford's duties changed with the outbreak of the American Revolutionary War. Spanish forces, allied with France and the American colonial rebels, moved to capture British West Florida. January 1780 found Durnford in command of Fort Charlotte in Mobile, an old French fort in disrepair that had been formerly known as Fort Conde. His force of 287 regulars and irregulars was opposed by a Spanish force of 2,000 troops that arrived in Mobile Bay on 10 February 1780. Given that Durnford was greatly outnumbered, the Spanish demanded the surrender of the British force, but Durnford refused, hoping for a relief force from Pensacola. The opposing commanders carried on protracted and polite negotiations over wine and cigars, while the Spanish prepared to take the old fort. Relief was not forthcoming and on 10 March 1780 Durnford surrendered, his estate having been burnt.

As part of the surrender to the Spanish commander Bernardo de Gálvez, Durnford received an agreement that his garrison would be accorded the honours of war and that the Spanish would not punish the people of the town for the defence. De Gálvez agreed but insisted that the armed colonists would be treated as prisoners of war. This was agreed, and Spanish troops entered Fort Charlotte in August 1780. De Gálvez later captured Pensacola and the rest of West Florida in 1781.

Durnford and his family returned to Britain where he carried on his military career. In the 1790s he campaigned against the French forces in Martinique, Guadeloupe and St. Lucia.

== Family ==
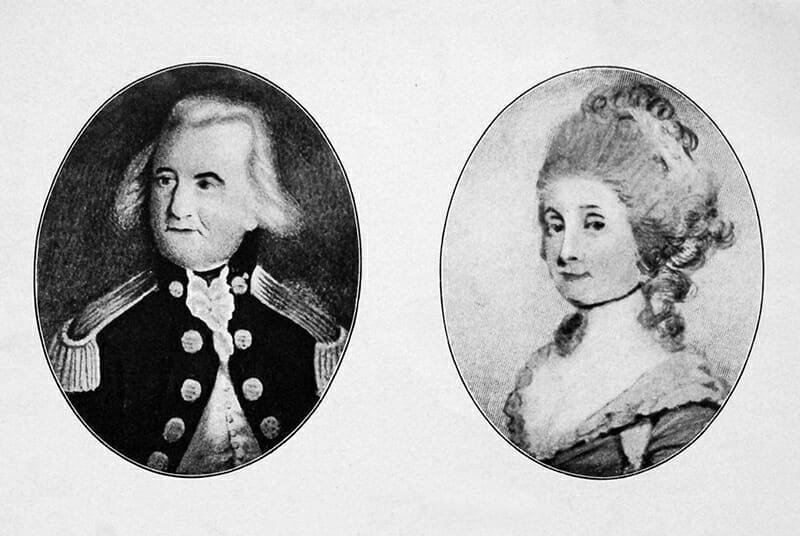
Elias Durnford and Rebecca Walker

While in England on 25 August 1769 Durnford married Rebecca Walker. Durnford and his wife had nine children, five sons and four daughters. He was the father of soldier-engineer Major General Elias Walker Durnford.

== Death ==
Elias Durnford died from yellow fever on 21 June 1794 while on the island of Tobago.

Preceded by John Eliot (acting)	Acting Governor of British West Florida; 1769	Succeeded by Peter Chester
