= List of wars involving Belize =

This is a list of wars involving the Dominion of Belize.

== List ==
Conflict	Combatant 1	Combatant 2	Results
Capture of Río Hondo (1779) (part of American Revolutionary War)	Kingdom of Great Britain	Kingdom of Spain	British victory
Capture of Cayo Cocina (1779) (part of American Revolutionary War)	Kingdom of Great Britain	Kingdom of Spain	
Battle of St. George's Caye (1798) (part of the French Revolutionary Wars)	Great Britain	Spain	British victory
Caste War of Yucatán (1847–1933)(part of the Mexican Indian Wars)	Mexico; Guatemala; Republic of Yucatán (1847–1848); British Honduras (from 1897)	Chan Santa Cruz; Supported by: United Kingdom: British Honduras (until 1897); Maya people	1847–1883: Mayan victory: State of Chan Santa Cruz established.; 1884–1915: Mexican victory: Mexico recaptures the Yucatan Peninsula.; Minor clashes until 1933.
