= HMS Merlin (1796) =

Sloop of the Royal Navy

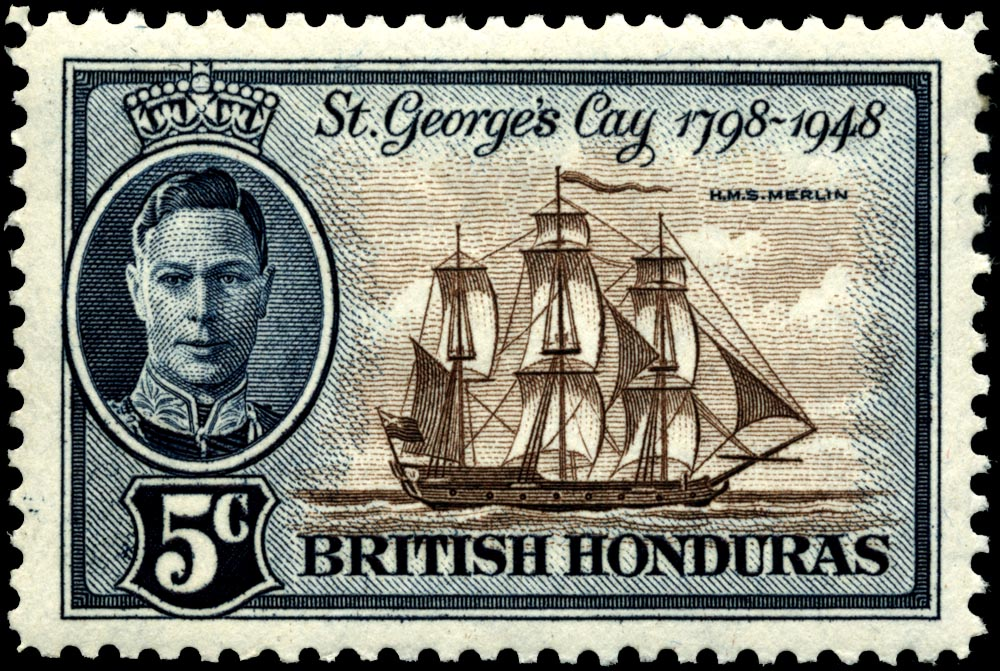
- HMS Merlin on a stamp of 1949, celebrating the 150th Anniversary of the Battle of St. George's Caye

History

Great Britain
- Name: HMS Merlin
- Ordered: 24 January 1795
- Builder: John Dudman, Deptford
- Laid down: June 1795
- Launched: 1 June 1796
- Fate: Broken up January 1803

General characteristics
- Class & type: Merlin-class
- Type: sloop
- Tons burthen: 37065/94 (bm)
- Length: Overall: 106 ft 2 in (32.4 m); Keel: 87 ft 7 in (26.7 m)
- Beam: 28 ft 2 1/2 in (8.6 m)
- Draught: Unladen: 7 ft 5 in (2.3 m); Laden: 11 ft 5 in (3.5 m)
- Depth of hold: 13 ft 10 in (4.2 m)
- Propulsion: Sails
- Complement: 121
- Armament: Initially; Upper deck (UD): 16 × 6-pounder guns; QD: 4 × 12-pounder carronades; Fc: 2 × 12-pounder carronades; Later; UD: 14 × 32-pounder carronades; QD: 4 × 24-pounder carronades; Fc: 2 × 9-pounder bow chasers

HMS Merlin was one of the two original Merlin-class sloops that served the Royal Navy during the French Revolutionary Wars. She was launched in 1796 and was broken up in 1803. Her greatest accomplishment was her role as the leading vessel in a motley flotilla of local vessels that defeated a Spanish attack on the British colonists in British Honduras (now Belize) at the Battle of St. George's Caye. She later captured a number of small merchant vessels in the West Indies before returning to Britain, where she was broken up.

== Service ==
Commander Thomas Dundas commissioned Merlin in April 1796. She was among the 13 vessels that shared in the prize money for the capture of the Augustine and the recapture of Nelly on 20 August. (Note: A captain's share of the prize money was worth £5 13s 1¼d; a seaman or marine's share was 4d.)

Dundas then sailed Merlin for Jamaica in August, and on to Honduras in December, where he delivered arms to prepare the colony for an attack by the Spanish coming down from Yucatan. Dundas received promotion to post-captain on 9 July 1798, and Commander John Ralph Moss replaced him on Merlin in August 1798.

Moss took command of a motley locally acquired, fitted, and armed flotilla of three sloops — Mermaid, Towzer and Tickler, two schooners — Swinger and Teazer, and eight gun flats (row boats with a gun in the bow). Except for the crew of Merlin, and the crews of Towser and Tickler, who were merchant seamen, the rest of the crews consisted of 354 volunteers from the "Colonial Troops".

The British flotilla under Moss repulsed the Spanish expedition at the Battle of St. George's Caye in September 1798. There were no British casualties in the several days of maneuvering and fighting.

In the period between 11 February 1799 and 30 March, Merlin captured one merchant vessel.

In August 1799 Commander William Robinson replaced Moss. Between October 1799 and February 1800, Merlin captured, detained, or recaptured a number of merchant vessels:

- French schooner, Fleur de la Merre, in ballast, sailing to Cape Francois;
- American sloop Greyhound, of 90 tons, sailing from Baltimore to Santiago de Cuba with provisions and dry goods;
- Schooner Balcarras, sailing from Port Maria to Santiago de Cuba, having been taken by a French privateer;
- Spanish schooner Del Carmen, sailing from Porto Caballo to Jamaica with a cargo of mules, donkeys, and copper, taken near Santiago de Cuba;
- Brig San Francisco, sailing from Puerto Rico to Santiago de Cuba with a cargo of mahogany and fustic, having been taken by a French privateer;
- Schooner La Mel, sailing from Baltimore with a cargo of flour and dry goods, and taken off Barracca;
- English schooner carrying dry goods and specie; and
- Spanish schooner.

Between 28 February and 20 May, Merlin captured two Spanish schooners:

- Dorothea, which was carrying salt, hams, candles, and spirits from Kingston to Santiago de Cuba; and
- St Raphael, carrying hides.

During the same period, Merlin recaptured the British ship Bellona, of ten guns and 600 tons, which had been sailing from London to Saint Lucia.

During the period 20 May and 3 August Merlin captured the Isabella, from Cuba, and the Experience.

At some point within 1800, Commander Henry Dawe replaced Robinson. Merlin's next captain, from 15 September 1800, was Commander John Child, under whom she served on the Jamaica station. In September 1801 she captured a Spanish privateer on the north side of Jamaica, that had one gun on a circular sweep. Child put twenty men aboard her and for a while she served as a tender to Merlin. This vessel was probably the felucca Tigre, which Merlin captured on 18 September, and for which Merlin's crew finally received head money in March 1828. (Note: A first-class share of the prize money was worth £42 19s 10½d; a fifth class share, that of a seaman, was worth 5s 4¼d.)

== Fate ==
Her last captain was Commander Philip Dumaresque, in 1803. She was broken up in January 1803.
