= Postage stamps and postal history of Belize =

The postage stamps and postal history of Belize cover the development of postal services in Belize, formerly the British colony of British Honduras. Letters sent via Jamaica are known from 1786, and the first local post office opened on 31 October 1809. British postage stamps were introduced in 1858, followed by the colony’s own stamps in 1866.

Early issues depicted British monarchs, while later stamps featured local landscapes, wildlife, industries and historical events. Following the colony’s renaming as Belize in June 1973, existing stamps were overprinted with the new name before stamps inscribed “Belize” were issued later that year. Belize became independent on 21 September 1981.

== British Honduras ==
Letters were sent via Jamaica, and are known from 1786. A handstamp reading "Belize" is seen on foreign mail from about 1800, and the first local post office dates from 31 October 1809.

British postage stamps were introduced in 1858, with obliteration "A06" used at Belize. This continued until the colony took over the operation of its own posts on 1 April 1860, and thereafter mail was stampless, handstamps being used to indicate payment of postage.

In 1866 the colony introduced its own stamps. The design was a profile of Queen Victoria typical of British stamps of the time, with an oval band reading "BRITISH HONDURAS" and the denomination, which in the first issue consisted of 1d, 6d, and 1sh values. The design continued in use until the Key Plate issue of 1891, with periodic changes of watermark and perforation.

The currency changed from pounds to cents and dollars in 1888, which necessitated the surcharging of the stamp stock with values ranging from 2c to 50c. The Key Plate issue of 1891 ended the need for surcharges; initially consisting of 6 values, 5c and 10c values were added in 1895, and a 25c value in 1898.

1899 saw a modified key plate design inscribed "POSTAGE & REVENUE". Existing stamps were also overprinted "REVENUE" for use as fiscals. The design was retained, but with a new monarchial portrait in 1902, for Edward VII, while George V's accession resulted in a new design issued from 1913 on.

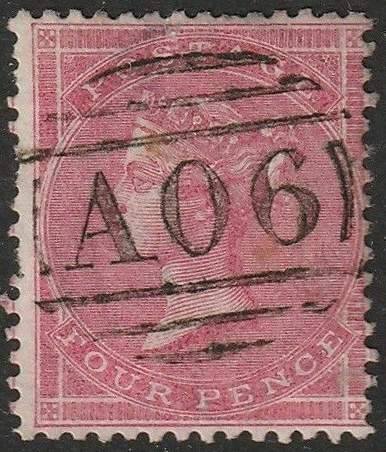
British postage stamp used in Belize, circa 1858

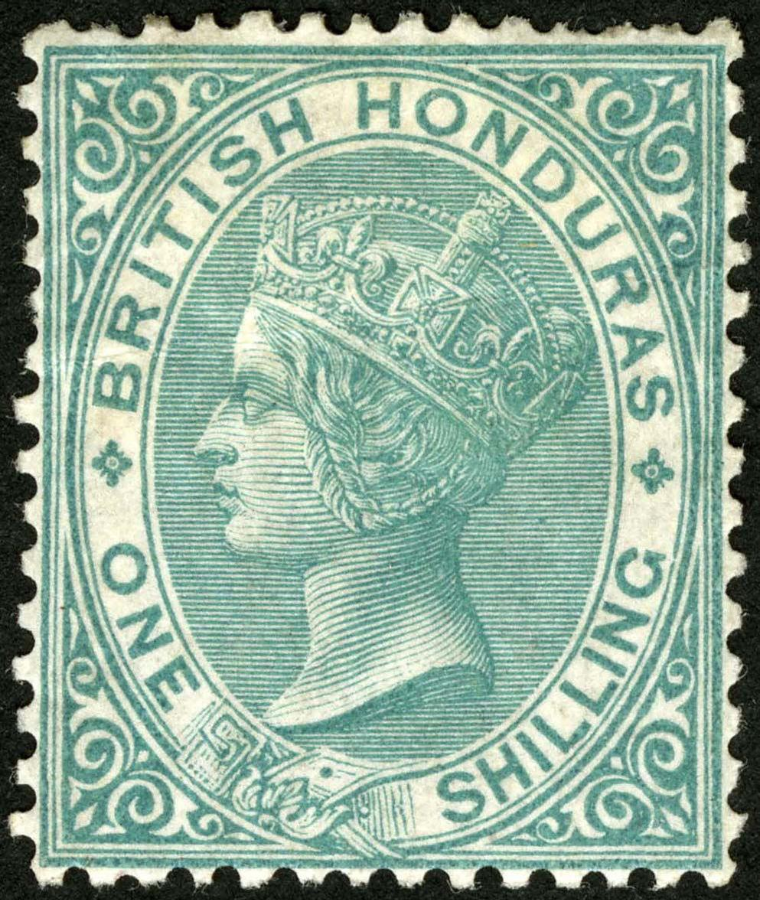
1866 design featuring Queen Victoria, 1sh

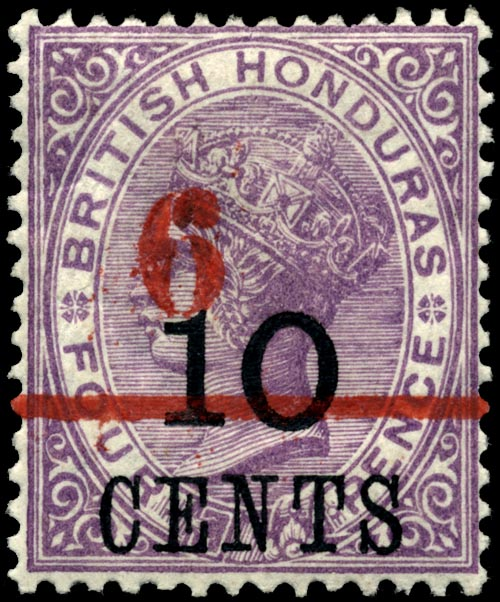
1866 design, twice overprinted

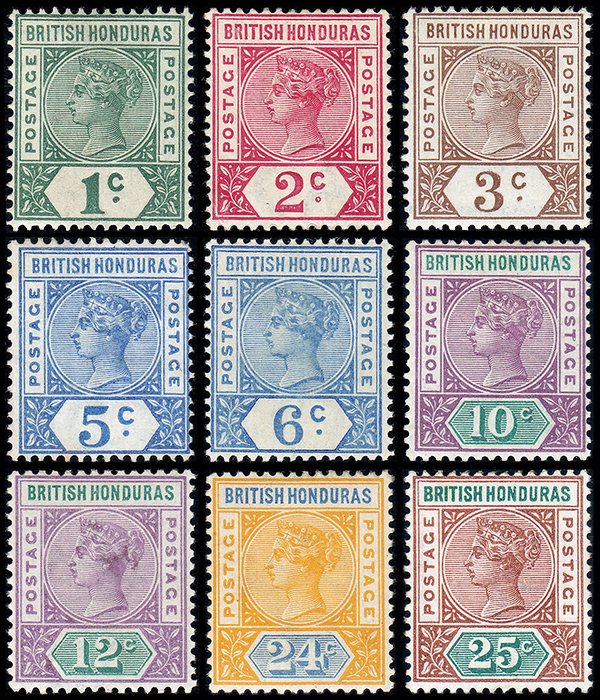
1891 to 1898 designs

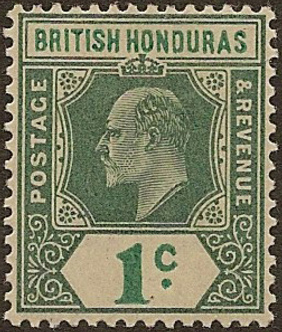
1902 design featuring Edward VII

British Honduras' first commemorative stamp was a 2c carmine Peace issue appearing in 1921; the following year the same design was reissued as a 4c stamp in grey, but with the words "Peace" removed from the design.

As with many of the British colonies, British Honduras issued its first pictorial stamps in 1938, a series consisting of 12 stamps with values from 1c to $5. The two-color designs included Maya figures, agricultural industries, and local scenes.

The 150th anniversary of the Battle of St. George's Caye was commemorated with six stamps in 1949, three depicting the cay, and three depicting HMS Merlin.

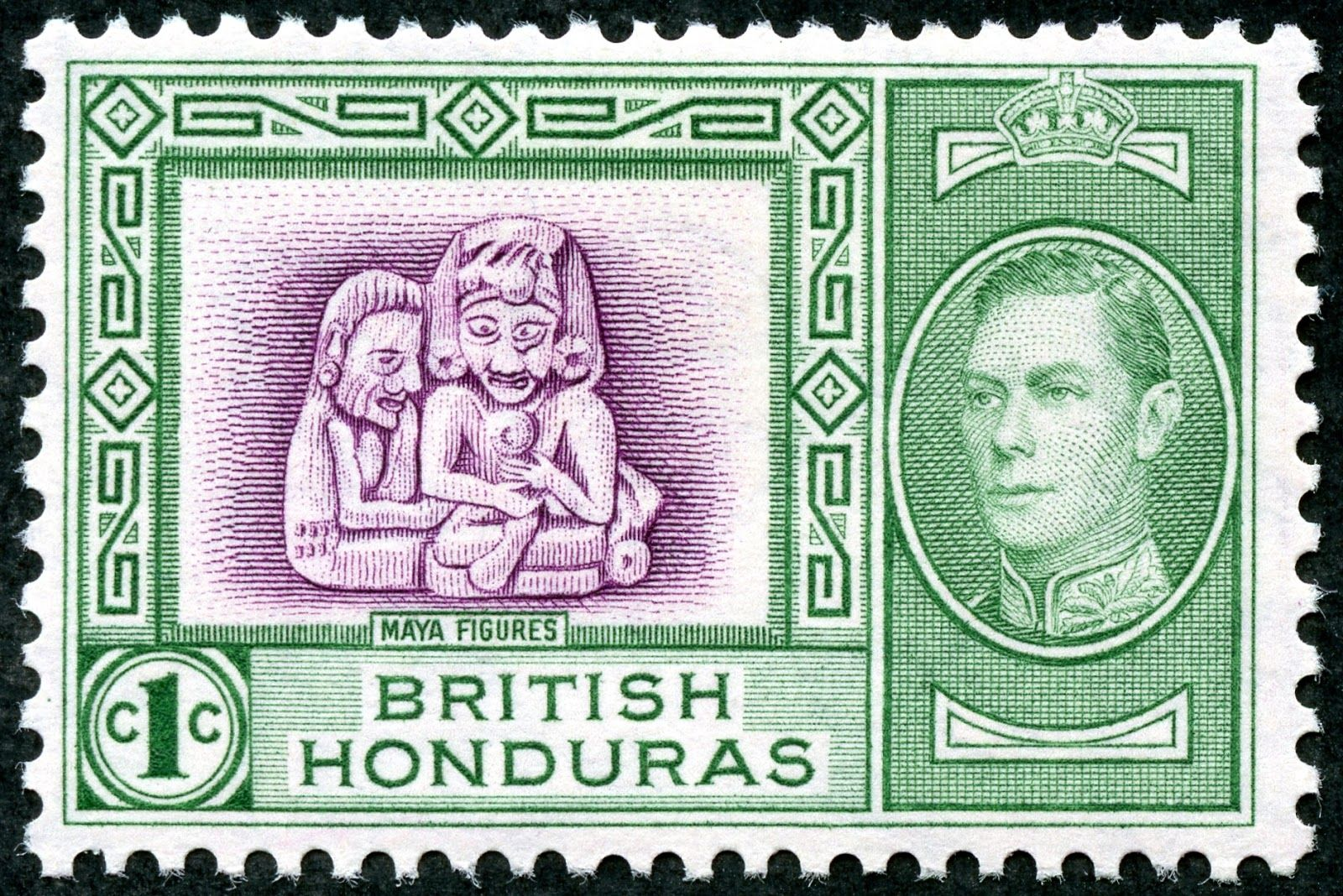
1938 1c stamp, featuring Maya figures

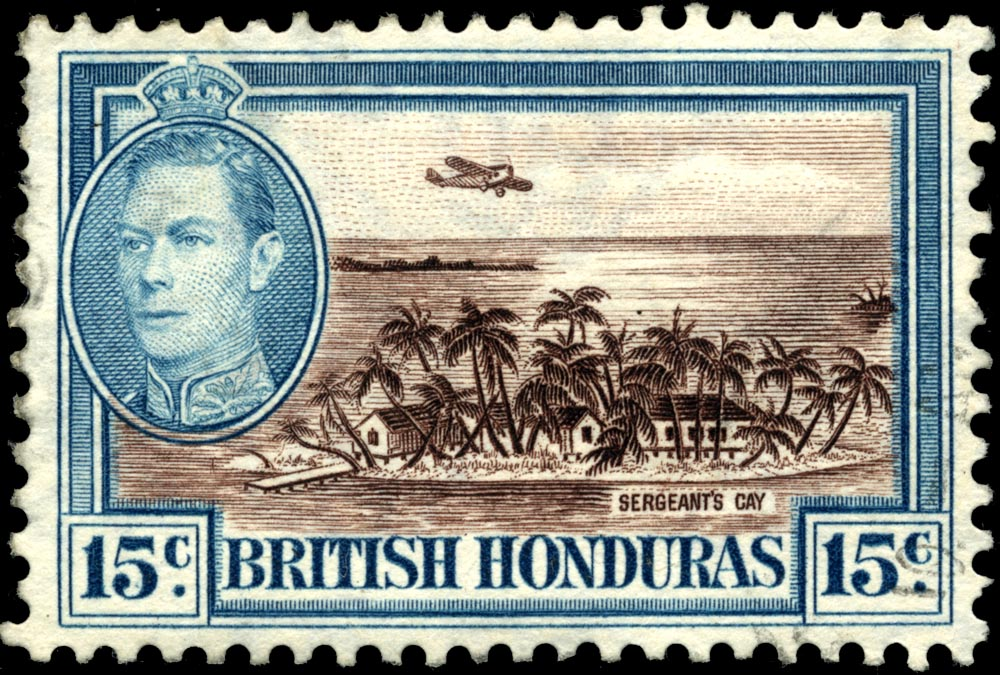
1938 15c stamp, showing Sergeant's Cay

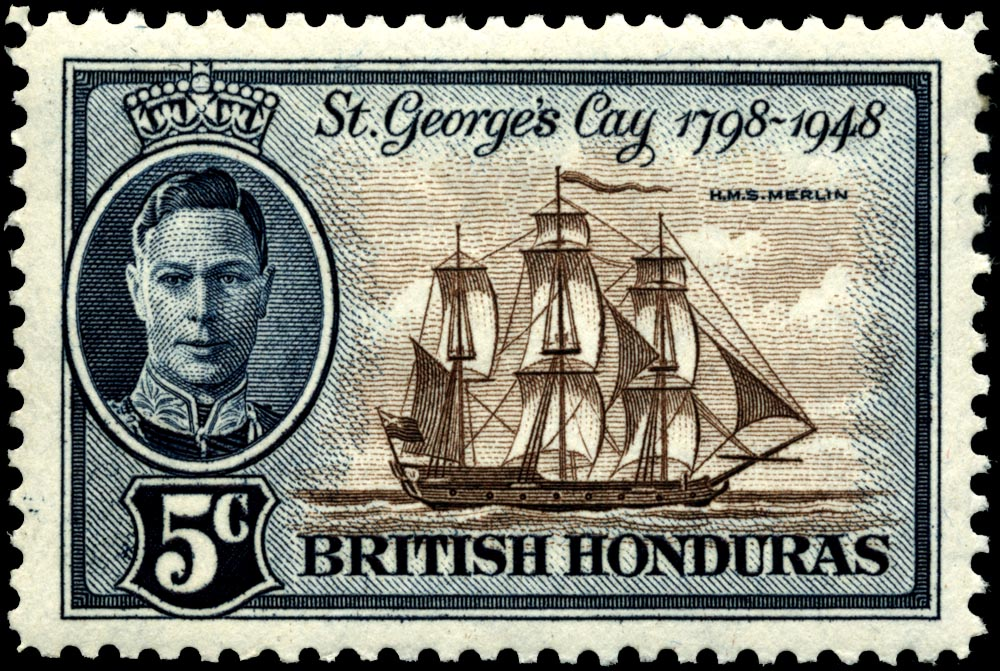
HMS Merlin on a stamp of 1949

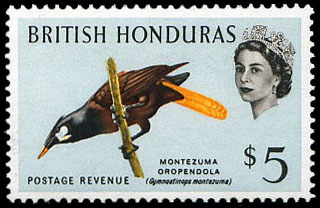
1962 stamp, featuring Elizabeth II and a Montezuma oropendola

== Change of name ==
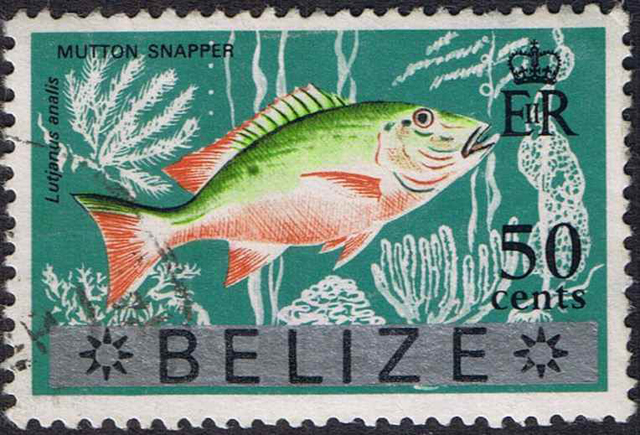
1973 stamp with "Belize" overprint

British Honduras was granted self-government on 1 January 1964 and issued its last issue as British Honduras at the beginning of 1973, celebrating the festivals of Belize.

On 1 June 1973 British Honduras was renamed Belize and the first issue in 1973 used stamps of the former British Honduras opted with BELIZE and two stars. The first issue without overprinting followed this in 1973 with a Royal Wedding issue of two stamps.

Belize was granted independence on 21 September 1981.

== Cayes of Belize ==
Stamps inscribed "Cayes of Belize" were issued in 1984 and 1985.

== See also ==
- Revenue stamps of British Honduras
