= Battle of San Fernando de Omoa =

1779 battle

Coordinates: 15°46′26″N 88°02′11″W

- Part of the American Revolutionary War
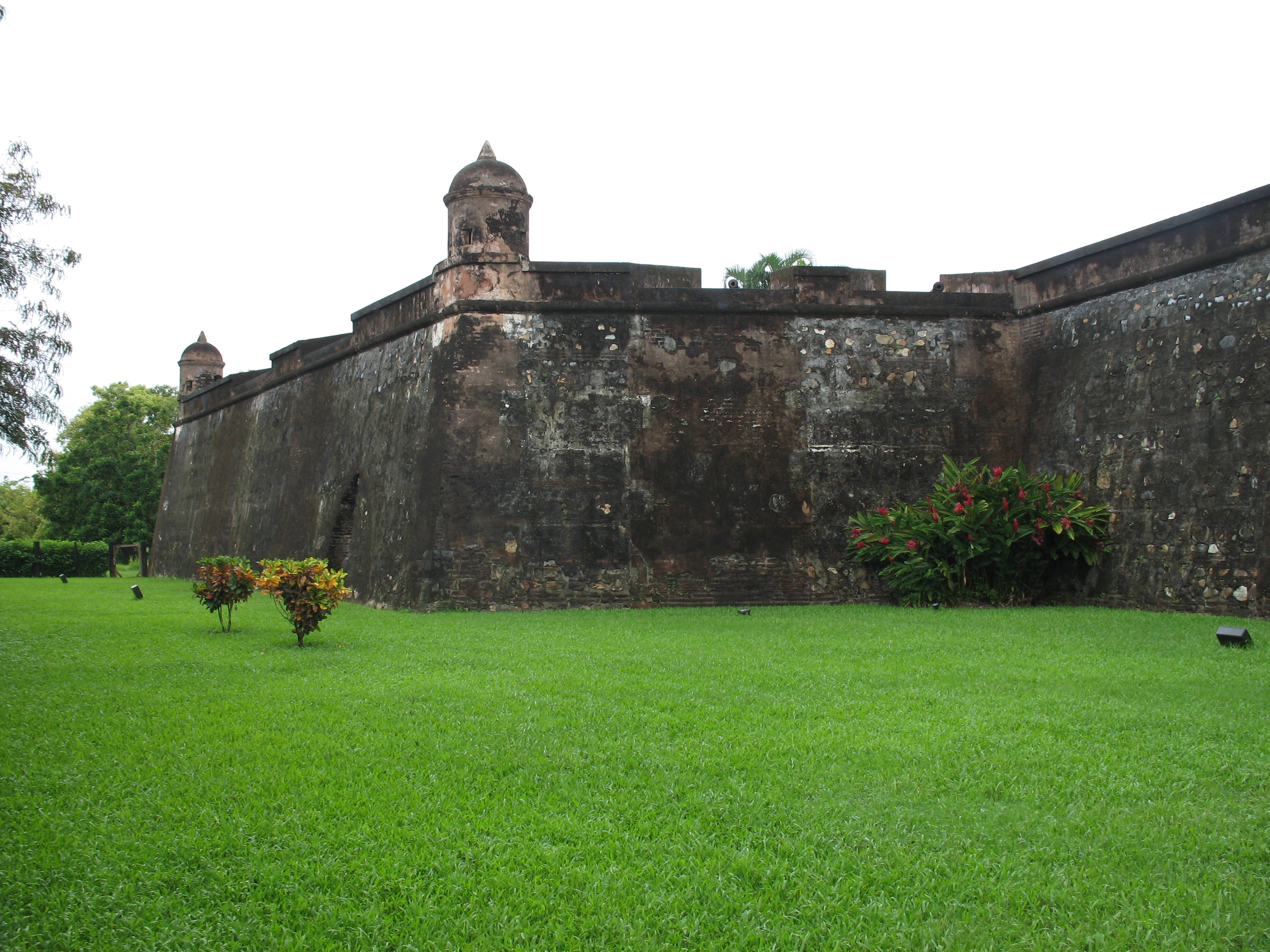
- Exterior view of the fort at San Fernando de Omoa. Photo taken in 2006
| Date | 16 October – 29 November 1779 |
| Location | San Fernando de Omoa, Captaincy General of Guatemala, present-day Honduras |
| Result | British victory: Subsequent withdrawal on the 29 November.; The fortress was later reoccupied by Spain. |

Belligerents
| Great Britain | Spain |

Commanders and leaders
| William Dalrymple; John Luttrell | Matías de Gálvez; Simón Desnaux; Juan Dastiex |

Strength
| 885 regulars, marines, militia, & natives 12 ships | 365 regulars & militia 2 ships |

Casualties and losses
| 6 killed 14 wounded additional casualties to disease 1 frigate damaged | 2 wounded 360 captured 2 ships captured |

The Battle of San Fernando de Omoa was a short siege and battle between British and Spanish forces fought not long after Spain entered the American Revolutionary War on the American side. On the 16 October 1779, following a brief attempt at siege, a force of 150 British soldiers and seamen assaulted and captured the fortifications at San Fernando de Omoa in the Captaincy General of Guatemala (now Honduras) on the Gulf of Honduras.

The British forces managed to overwhelm and capture the Spanish garrison, consisting of 365 men. The British only held the fort until November 1779. They then withdrew the garrison, which tropical diseases had reduced, and which was under threat of a Spanish counter-attack.

== Background ==
When Spain entered the American Revolutionary War in June 1779, both Great Britain and Spain had been planning for the possibility of hostilities for some time. King Carlos III set the defence of the Captaincy General of Guatemala as one of his highest priorities in the Americas, after the conquest of British West Florida. His forces seized the initiative in North America, where they rapidly captured the British outpost at Baton Rouge in September 1779, before the British were able to marshal any kind of significant defensive force in the area. The British sought to gain control over Spanish colonies in Central America, and their first target was San Fernando de Omoa, a fortress that Matías de Gálvez, the Captain General of Guatemala, called "the key and outer wall of the kingdom".

However, the Spanish struck first. In September the capture of Cayo Cocina gave them possession of the British settlement at St. George's Caye (off the coast near present-day Belize City).

Then, anticipating a British attack against the nearby port of Santo Tomás de Castilla, Gálvez withdrew the garrison there to Omoa. The Spanish had started building San Fernando de Omoa, principally with African slave labour, in the 1740s during the War of Jenkins' Ear. It became of the largest defensive fortifications in Central America, and one of the Guatemalan Captaincy General's principal Caribbean ports.

=== British forces ===
The decision by Gálvez to withdraw to Omoa upset British plans. Commodore John Luttrell, in command of three ships and 250 men, had intended an attack on the Santo Tómas, but his force was inadequate for an attack on Omoa. Even when he and Captain William Dalrymple arrived at Omoa on the 25 September with 500 men, they were forced to retreat after a brief exchange of cannon fire. The British returned with a force of more than 1,200 men and twelve ships in early October.

== Battle ==
The British established some batteries to fire on the fort, and supported them with fire from three ships. Simón Desnaux, the fort's commander, returned fire. He succeeded in damaging HMS Lowestoffe, which ran aground but was eventually refloated. Although Desnaux was badly outnumbered, he refused an offer for surrender in the hope that Gálvez would be able to send reinforcements.

On the night of the 20 October, a small number of British attackers climbed into the fort and opened one of the gates. After a brief exchange of small arms fire, Desnaux surrendered. Among the spoils the British won when they gained control of Omoa were two Spanish ships, anchored in the harbour, that held more than three million Spanish dollars of silver.

=== Counterattack ===
Gálvez immediately began planning a counterattack. On the 25 November his forces began besieging the fort, now under Dalrymple's control, engaging in regular exchanges of cannon fire. Gálvez, whose force was smaller than Dalrymple's, magnified its apparent size by setting extra campfires around the fort. He then attempted an assault on the 29 November but difficulties with his artillery caused him to call it off. Still, Dalrymple, whose forces were significantly reduced by tropical diseases, withdrew his men from the fort and evacuated them that same day.

== Aftermath ==
The British continued to make attacks on the Central American coast but were never successful in their goal of dividing the Spanish colonies and gaining access to the Pacific Ocean. Equally, the Spanish were unsuccessful in driving out the British settlements in Central America, most of which the British had recaptured by the war's end.

=== The British Tar at Omoa ===
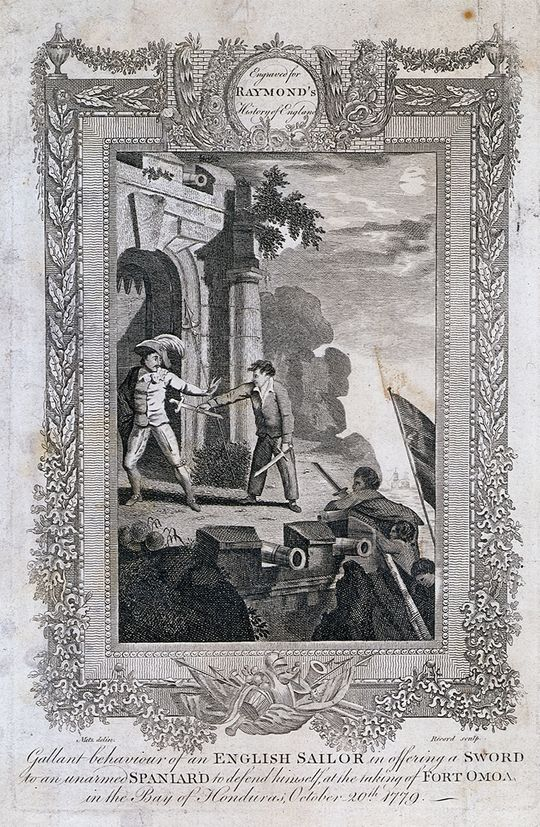
18th century print depicting a British sailor offering a sword to an unarmed Spaniard

Though a fairly small engagement and a short lived victory, the storming of the fortifications at Omoa was the scene of an event that would be repeatedly depicted by British engravers for years to come. Captain William Dalrymple, in his letter to Lord George Germain dated the 21 October 1779, wrote:

Your lordship will pardon my mentioning an instance of an elevated mind in a British tar, which amazed the Spaniards, and gave them a very high idea of English valour: not content with one cutlass, he scrambled up the walls with two; and meeting a Spanish officer without arms, who had been roused out of his sleep, had the generosity not to take any advantage; but presenting him with one of his cutlasses, told him, "You are now on a footing with me."

This incident was first put into print by William Humphrey in 1780, and later by John Thornton in 1783, John Record about 1785, and an unknown engraver for The Gentleman's and London Magazine: Or Monthly Chronologer in 1789.

== Bibliography ==
- Beatson, Robert (1804). Naval and Military Memoirs of Great Britain, from 1727 to 1783, Volume 6 (2nd ed.). Longman, Hurst, Rees and Orme. Contains surrender agreement (pp. 163ff).
- Chávez, Thomas E (2004). Spain and the Independence of the United States: An Intrinsic Gift. UNM Press. ISBN 978-0-8263-2794-9. OCLC 149117944.
- Fernández Duro, Cesáreo (1902). Armada Española desde la unión de los reinos de Castilla y Aragón. Vol. VII. Madrid, Spain: Est. tipográfico "Sucesores de Rivadeneyra".
- Fortescue, John William (1902). A History of the British Army, Volume 3. Macmillan.
- Lovejoy, Paul E; Trotman, David, eds. (2003). Trans-Atlantic Dimensions of Ethnicity in the African Diaspora. London: Continuum. ISBN 978-0-8264-4907-8. OCLC 475624274.
- Marley, David (1998). Wars of the Americas: a chronology of armed conflict in the New World, 1492 to the present. Santa Barbara, USA: ABC-CLIO. ISBN 978-0-87436-837-6.
- Ortiz Escamilla, Juan (2005). Fuerzas militares en Iberoamérica siglos XVIII y XIX. México: El Colegio de Michoacán A.C. ISBN 978-968-12-1161-5.
