= Battle of St. George's Caye =

1798 attempted Spanish invasion of British Honduras during the French Revolutionary Wars

- Part of the French Revolutionary Wars
Date	3–10 September 1798
Location	Saint George's Caye, off the coast of Belize 17.5531°N 88.0739°W
Result	British victory

Belligerents
Great Britain	Spain

Commanders and leaders
John Moss; Thomas Barrow	Arturo O'Neill

Strength
13 vessels (4 sloops, 2 schooners, 7 gunboats); 700 troops Armed slaves	35 vessels 2,500 soldiers and sailors

Casualties and losses
Unknown	Unknown

The Battle of St. George's Caye was a military engagement that lasted from 3 to 10 September 1798, off the coast of British Honduras (present-day Belize). However, the name is typically reserved for the final battle that occurred on 10 September in which the Spanish were defeated. The events of 10 September 1798 marked the final Spanish attempt to take over the area. In Belize, the Battle of St. George's Caye is a national public and bank holiday.

== Background ==
The battle took place between an invading force from Mexico, attempting to assert Spanish claims to present-day Belize, and a small force of resident woodcutters called Baymen, who fought for their livelihood assisted by black slaves. After the final two and a half-hour battle, ravaged by sickness, the Spaniards withdrew.

The control of a territory including portions of what is now known as Belize was contested by Britain and Spain from as early as the mid-1750s. Although never occupying the territory, Spain considered it part of its Central American territories, which then included portions of present-day Mexico and Guatemala.

The British had entered the territory in 1638. However, the settlement of Belize/British Honduras was somewhat accidental. British sailors became shipwrecked along the coast and decided to settle there. These buccaneers decided to stop raiding Spanish treasure fleets for imaginary gold and harvest Logwood and later Mahogany which were plentiful in Belize. Spain recognized this trade in the Treaty of Paris (signed in 1763) but did not end the dispute by ceding interest, delineating boundaries.

The Spaniards had previously attempted to expel the colonists on six occasions, most recently in 1779. The settlement on St Georges Caye was abandoned, Baymen and their African slaves relocating to Havana, Cuba.

One tactic the Spanish utilized in the early 18th century was a propaganda campaign in which Spanish officials enticed the enslaved woodcutters, often poorly treated, to defect. This campaign was successful for a time, and many enslaved Africans were given freedom by the governor of Yucatan. Eventually the enslaved population would side with the British in the battle.

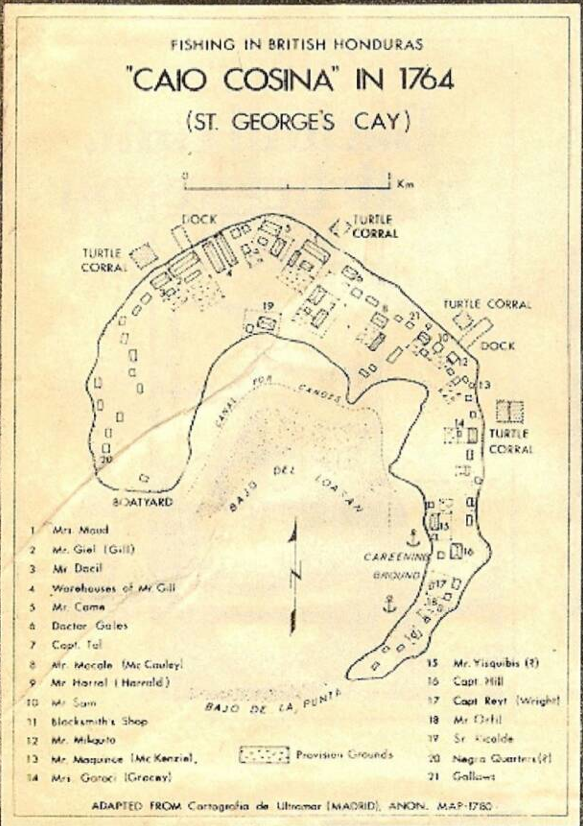
Map St. George's Caye in 1764

=== Treaty of Versailles and the Superintendency ===
In 1783, hostilities were temporarily halted with signing of the Treaty of Versailles, which conveyed the Baymen rights between the Belize and Hondo rivers; this was extended with the 1786 Convention of London to the Sibun River. Cutting rights were granted to the settlers on condition the settlement be recognized as belonging to Spain. Superintendent Col. Edward Marcus Despard was to administer the terms of the treaty – however, Despard's refusal to acknowledge race or colour as a distinction in law, prompted the Baymen to petition London for his removal.

The Treaty of Versailles in 1783 affirmed the boundaries set by the Treaty of Paris to cut logwood and later extended by the Convention of London in 1786. In this treaty, Spain gave permission to the British to cut mahogany and logwood from way down south to the Sibun River. It strongly forbade the British to settle any formal government during the agriculture work. Absolutely no economical activity more than cutting logwood. The Convention of London also specified that in return for the concessions Spain had made, the British were to give up all its other settlements in the region, notably the Mosquito Shore and the island of Roatan. The British were forced to evacuate 2,650 colonists and slaves from the Roatan and the Mosquito Shore to Belize.

As part of the 1783 Treaty of Versailles the British recognized Central and South America as a "Spanish Continent". Unlike the Mosquito Shore and the island of Roatan, British Honduras was never conquered from the Spanish, therefore the British were allowed to keep the colony. The idea that British Honduras was on a continent acknowledged by the British as Spanish led to a persistent desire by the Spanish to take the colony.

=== Ships ===
The British ships that were sent from Jamaica to assist the baymen were Merlin, Teazer and Tickler. Dobson, N. (1979) On the morning of 10 September, fourteen of the largest Spaniard ships approached and anchored approximately one mile away from HMS Merlin, the leading vessel that was relocated from Jamaica to assist the Baymen, and the other British seacrafts. Captain John Moss, captain of the Merlin, believed that the Spaniards would wait to attack the following day, however, the attack ensued at 2:30 pm. The conflict launched approximately two hours and a half of action until the Spaniards abruptly cut their cables and departed towards Caye Chapel. The Merlin was unable to chase after them due to the shallow waters.

== Prelude ==
Humphreys relates that in a 1796 visit to the area, Visitador Juan O'Sullivan claimed the British were encroaching on Spanish territory in Mexico by cutting near the Hondo. Upon his return to Spain, hostilities broke out between Great Britain and Spain as a result of the Napoleonic Wars. The Spanish viewed the situation seriously and determined to remove the British.

Colonists appealed to Jamaican Lieutenant Governor Alexander Lindsay, 6th Earl of Balcarres, for assistance. Even though he was in the midst of the Maroon Wars, Balcarres nonetheless sent muskets and ammunition to the settlement and a further shipment arrived on Commander Thomas Dundas' ship HMS Merlin in December 1796. But upon his arrival, Dundas noted panic in the settlement and the subsequent dispatching of slaves to cut logwood instead of preparing to defend the settlement.

Balcarres then named Major (promoted to Lieutenant Colonel) Thomas Barrow Superintendent of the settlement. Barrow, a seasoned veteran of war according to Humphreys, immediately began whipping the unruly Baymen into shape, and martial law, stopping all activities in the settlement, was declared on 11 February 1797. On 18 March, magistrates Thomas Potts, Thomas Graham and Marshall Bennett all asked Barrow whether there were any incoming messages from Jamaica. Barrow assured that more help would be on the way soon, to alleviate the fears of the Baymen, but Humphreys calls the actions of Potts and company "cowardly" and says that even after that reassurance morale was low.

=== June evacuation meeting ===
Impatient with the plans to defend the settlement, the Baymen called a public meeting for 1 June 1797. At this meeting, the Baymen voted 65 to 51 to defend the settlement and cooperate with Barrow. This initial support wavered considerably between then and September 1798, as reports came in of the size of the Spanish fleet. Don Arturo O'Neill, Yucatán Governor and Commander of the expedition, had secured:

...two very large frigates, an armed brig, and two sloops carrying two 100-pounders, and four gunboats carrying each a 24-pounder in bow; with several other armed vessels, arrived... at Campeachy, and taking aboard about 300 troops, then sailed and (made a rendezvous) at the island of Cozumel;...the two frigates and the brig left the fleet there and as the deserters understood, returned to La Vera Cruz... A schooner of 22 guns, to which they (the deserters) belonged, then became commodore...All the small vessels of the fleet were to be sent to Bacalar to assist in embarking the troops at that place, said to consist of 12 companies of 100 men each...

This estimate was severely reduced due to outbreaks of yellow fever and dissent in the Spanish army. Nevertheless, it was enough to frighten the Baymen into posting lookouts near the boundaries of the territory.

=== Baymen's preparations ===
Merlin's captain in 1798 was John Moss, a strategist on the order of Barrow. By 18 July the fleet had reached Cozumel, leading the settlers to agree to arm their slaves, an act that affected the outcome of the battle due to the slaves' knowledge of warfare. There were still some who were cautious and demanded evacuation, including Potts, but Balcarres ignored them and imposed martial law on 26 July.

The arming of the enslaved population of Africans for the defense of the colony is one of the most remarkable decisions. The enslaved population of Belize was imported as part of the Triangle Trade. But unlike many other British colonies in the Caribbean there was no plantation system in Belize, instead the enslaved population harvested logwood and mahogany. Arming the enslaved population which outnumbered the small number of the white landowning class 20-1 was too risky for many elites who chose evacuation instead.

The Settlement lineup consisted of the following: Merlin, two sloops, Towzer and Tickler, with one 18-pounder gun and 25 men each, and under the command of two merchant captains, Mr. Gelston and Mr. Hosmer, who brought with them some of their crew; Mermaid, with one short 9-pounder and 25 men; the schooners, Swinger and Teazer, with six guns and 25 men each, Swinger having four 6-pounder guns and two 4-pounders, and Teazer six 4-pounders; and eight gun-flats, each with one 9-pounder and 16 men. Except for the crews of Towser and Tickler, the rest of the crews consisted of 354 volunteers from the "Colonial Troops". In addition there were 700 troops ready to deter attack by land.

== Battle ==
From 3 to 5 September, the Spaniards with 32 vessels, manned by 500 seamen and two thousand soldiers tried to force their way through Montego Caye shoal, blocked by the defenders. The military commanders, Moss and Barrow, differed on where to put their resources for the next phase of the fight: Barrow thought they would go to the land phase, while Moss decided on defending St. George's Caye. Moss arrived in time to stop the Spaniards, setting the stage for 10 September.

At 1:00 p.m. that afternoon, the Spaniards and British lined up off St. George's Caye. The Spaniards stormed through the channel, and at 1:30 engaged the British in a two-hour fight which ended in defeat for the confused Spaniards. Moss reported no one killed and the Baymen in good spirits. Barrow was dispatched and arrived in time to see the end of the battle and prevent the slave men from boarding the enemy. The Spaniards were in full retreat by 13 September, and Barrow agreed to send vessels to further push the Spaniards back.

== Aftermath and mythmaking ==
Following the battle, Spanish efforts to take control of the settlement ceased. The battle was later commemorated as a national holiday and as a symbol of Belizean resistance. In contemporary Belizean society, the participation of Black slaves alongside the Baymen in the defence against the Spanish has been incorporated into national commemorations. Some scholars have argued that the African origins and enslaved status of these woodcutters have often received less attention than narratives presenting them as ancestors of the Belizean Creoles. A travel brochure in the 1990s described the Baymen as descendants of "English woodcutters".

The alliance has also been interpreted as part of a commemorative tradition emphasizing the achievements of white and Black Belizeans. However, historians have noted that this narrative downplays the Baymen's treatment of their slaves. A number of slaves who escaped from the settlement were emancipated by Spanish colonial authorities in Yucatán.

=== Commemoration ===
On the 100th anniversary of the battle, the colonial government declared 9 and 10 September a national holiday. The commemoration was organized by a Centennial Committee and has been interpreted as part of an ethnic and middle-class Creole narrative in Belize Town, intended to assert Creoles' status as natives and as equal partners with whites in the colony of British Honduras, now Belize.

The chief advocates in the committee were Henry Charles Usher, Wilfred A. Haylock, Benjamin Fairweather, and Absalom Hyde. They presented the battle as representing the contribution of both the Baymen and enslaved people to the colony. In their speeches, they argued that, had the Baymen and enslaved people not fought "shoulder to shoulder", British Honduras might have become a Spanish colony like Cuba or the Philippines. They also argued that, although enslaved people could have escaped, they remained and defended the settlement.

The Centennial celebrations have been interpreted as a means through which middle-class Creoles sought recognition in the society as "true patriots". Today, the event is celebrated as St. George's Caye Day on 10 September. It is considered a national and historic event recognizing the role of the Baymen and enslaved people as ancestors of Belize. In 1998, Belize issued three coins to commemorate the 200th anniversary of the battle. These consisted of a cupro-nickel $2 coin, a 0.925 silver $10 coin, and a 0.917 gold $100 coin. The obverse features a three-masted sailing vessel from the national coat-of-arms. The reverse features HMS Merlin and two oar-powered flat boats.

== See also ==
- Knocking Our Own Ting

== Sources ==
- Cain, Ernest. "The life story of Simon Lamb". Excerpt from an unpublished manuscript. Retrieved from:
- Defence of the Settlers of Honduras Against the Unjust and Unfounded Representations of Col. George Arthur, Late Superintendent of the Settlement (London: A. J. Valpy,1823). Retrieved from:
- Humphreys, H.F. "Gallant Spirits: The Battle of St. George's Caye." In Readings in Belizean History III.
- Lamb, Simon. Biography by National Heritage Library: and
- "Imagining the Colonial Nation: Race, Gender, and Middle-Class Politics in Belize, 1888–1898". In Race and Nation in Modern Latin America, edited by Nancy Appelbaum, Anne S. Macpherson, and Karin Alejandra Rosemblatt, 108–31. Chapel Hill: University of North Carolina Press, 2003
- Judd, Karen. (1989). "White Man, Black Man, Baymen, Creole Racial Harmony and Ethnic Identity in Belize". Paper presented at the 15th International Congress, Latin American Studies Association, San Juan, Puerto Rico. Retrieved from:
- Metzgen, Monrad Sigfrid (ed.), 1928, Shoulder to Shoulder or The Battle of Saint George's Caye
- Macpherson, Anne S. (2007). From Colony to Nation: Women Activists and the Gendering of Politics in Belize, 1912–1982. USA: University of Nebraska.
- Ramos, Adele. "Founder of the 10th celebrations, Simon lamb, remembered". In Amandala:
- Shoman, Assad. (1994, Revised 2000). Thirteen chapters of a history of Belize. Belize: Angelus Press.
- Vernon, L. (1994) I Love to Tell The Story. Heritage Printers, Belize City. Available online:
- The Making of Race and Place in Nineteenth-Century British Honduras
- The Evacuation of the Mosquito Shore and the English Who Stayed Behind, 1786-1800
- Logwood as a Factor in the Settlement of British Honduras
