= Castorena =

Castorena is a surname. Notable people with the surname include:

- Daniel Gutiérrez Castorena (born 1954), Mexican politician
- José Arnulfo Castorena (born 1978), Mexican Paralympic swimmer

== See also ==
- Juan Ignacio María de Castorena Ursúa y Goyeneche
