= Tickler =

Tickler may refer to:

- Tickler file, a collection of date-labeled file folders
- Tickler oscillator, a type of electronic circuit

== Ships ==
- HMS Tickler – one of several vessels of the British Royal Navy named Tickler
