= HMS Merlin =

Fourteen ships and one shore establishment of the Royal Navy have borne the name HMS Merlin, after Merlin, the wizard in Arthurian legend (the shore establishment RNAS Donibristle, like the other Naval Air Stations in Scotland, was named after the sea bird):

- English ship Merlin (1579) was a 10-gun pinnance built in 1579 and listed until 1601.
- English ship Merlin (1652) was a 14-gun yacht launched in 1652 and captured by a Dutch squadron off Cadiz in 1665 while she was convoying victualing ships to Tangier; her resistance restricted the Dutch to capturing only four of her charges.
- HMS Merlin (1666) was an 8-gun yacht launched in 1666 and sold in 1698.
- HMS Merlin (1699) was a 2-gun sloop launched in 1699 and sold in 1712.
- HMS Merlin (1744) was a 10-gun sloop launched in 1744 and sold in 1750.
- HMS Merlin (1753) was a 10-gun sloop in service in 1753.
- HMS Merlin (1756) was a 10-gun sloop launched in 1756. She was captured by a French privateer in 1757, but recaptured later that year and renamed HMS Zephyr. The French frigate Gracieuse recaptured her in August 1778; she was disarmed and sold at Toulon in January 1780 for Lt44,200. The purchasers turned her into a privateer, which the British privateer Fame captured and burnt on 26 August 1780.
- HMS Merlin (1757) was a 16-gun sloop launched in 1757, having been purchased on the stocks. She was abandoned and burnt in 1777 after she grounded on a sandbank while attacking the fort on Mud Island in the Delaware River below Philadelphia.
- HMS Merlin (1780) was an 18-gun sloop launched in 1780, having been purchased on the stocks. She was sold in 1795.
- HMS Merlin (1796) was a 16-gun sloop launched in 1796 and broken up in 1803.
- HMS Merlin (1803) was a 16-gun sloop, previously in civilian service as Hercules. She was purchased in 1803 and sold in 1836.
- HMS Merlin (1838) was a 4-gun wood paddle packet launched in 1838 and sold in 1863.
- HMS Merlin (1871) was a composite screw gunboat launched in 1871 and sold in 1891.
- HMS Merlin (1901) was a Cadmus-class sloop launched in 1901. She was used as a survey vessel from 1906 and was sold in 1923.

Merlin has also been the name of a Royal Naval Air Station shore establishment:

- HMS Merlin (shore establishment) was a Royal Navy airbase of the Fleet Air Arm, known as RNAS Donibristle and located at Donibristle, Fife. It was a former RAF station, but was transferred to the Admiralty and commissioned in 1939. It paid off in 1959.
