= Revenue stamps of British Honduras =

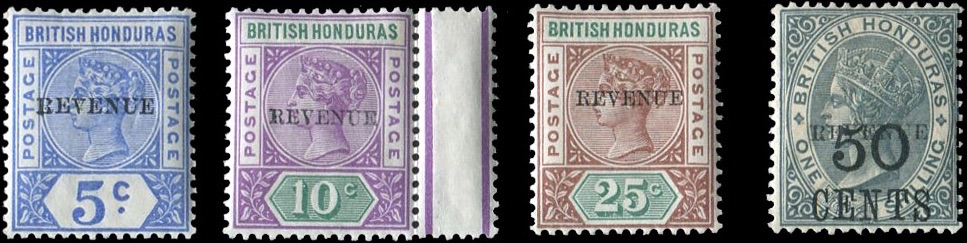
The 1899 revenue stamps of British Honduras

British Honduras (now known as Belize) issued revenue stamps in 1899. The only issue consisted of contemporary postage stamps overprinted "REVENUE". Four values exist - 5c, 10c, 25c and 50c on 1s, and there are two different sizes of the overprint - 11mm and 12mm long. Additionally there are a number of varieties in the overprint which are very collectible, such as "BEVENUE", "REVENU " and "REVE UE". Despite being intended for fiscal use, they were also valid for postal use.

No other revenues from British Honduras or Belize are known since postage stamps were used for fiscal purposes.

== See also ==
- Postage stamps and postal history of Belize
