= Martín de Mayorga =

Mexican politician

The Most Excellent Martín de Mayorga Ferrer
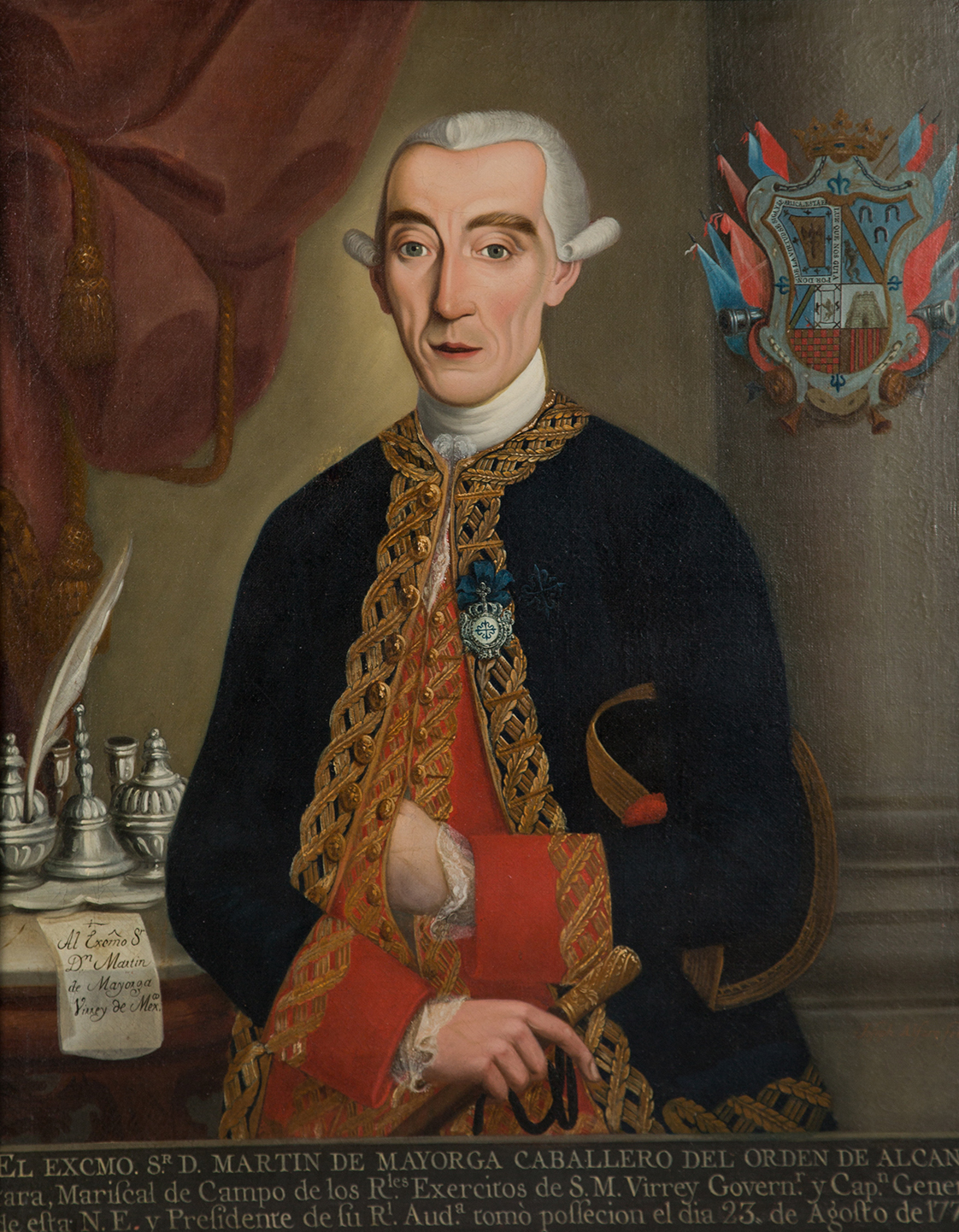

47th Viceroy of New Spain
- In office 23 August 1779 – 28 April 1783
- Monarch: Charles III
- Preceded by: Antonio María de Bucareli
- Succeeded by: Matías de Gálvez y Gallardo

Governor of Guatemala
- In office 2 June 1773 – 4 April 1779
- Monarch: Charles III
- Preceded by: Juan González Bustillo y Villaseñor
- Succeeded by: Matías de Gálvez y Gallardo

Personal details
- Born: 12 September 1721 Barcelona, Spain
- Died: 28 July 1783 (aged 61) Cádiz, Spain

Martín de Mayorga Ferrer (12 September 1721 in Barcelona – 28 July 1783 in Cádiz) was a Spanish military officer, governor of the Captaincy General of Guatemala (from June 1773 to 1779), and interim viceroy of New Spain (from 23 August 1779 to 28 April 1783).

== Career ==
Martín de Mayorga Ferrer was a field marshal in the royal army of Spain, and a knight of the military Order of Alcántara. He was governor, president of the Audiencia and captain general of Guatemala at the time of the devastating earthquake on 29 July 1773.

He was still serving in those positions at the time of the death of New Spain Viceroy Antonio María de Bucareli y Ursúa in Mexico City. When the Audiencia of Mexico opened the sealed instructions in the event of the death of Bucareli, they found that the captain general of Guatemala was named as replacement. When the instructions had been written, this was expected to be Matías de Gálvez y Gallardo, brother of José de Gálvez, minister of the Indies. However, Gálvez, although appointed to the position, had not yet arrived to fill it. The Audiencia of Mexico, therefore, named Marshal Martín de Mayorga, who still held the position, viceroy of New Spain.

On 23 August 1779, Mayorga arrived in Mexico City and took up his new position. Of immediate concern were preparations for defense in the war that France and Spain had recently declared on Britain. He greatly reinforced Havana, took extra precautions at Veracruz, and sent an expedition under Bernardo de Gálvez to Florida to aid the rebelling American colonists. There was also conflict with the British in Central America.

In 1779 there was an epidemic of smallpox that spread to many cities of the colony and caused many deaths. Viceroy Mayorga spent considerable sums to aid the sick and dying. He offered his resignation (the first of several times), but it was not accepted.

In January 1780, the indigenous community of Izúcar, (Puebla), rose in rebellion because of mistreatment. Captains José Antonio de Urízar and Tomás Pontón were sent to suppress the rebellion. A large number of captured rebels were sent to Havana to serve as sailors in the fleet.

Mayorga did much to improve the capital, paving many streets with stones and cleaning the waterways and aqueducts in an effort to prevent another epidemic.

In 1780 he directed the governor of Puebla to assemble documents related to the history of New Spain, beginning with the Historia Antigua de la Nueva España of historian Mariano Veytia and papers collected by Lorenzo Boturini Bernaducci. This project probably saved numerous documents that would otherwise have been lost.

In 1783, the viceroy once again submitted his resignation. This time it was accepted. He turned over the government of the colony to his replacement, Matías de Gálvez, on 28 April 1783 and left for Spain. He died just before or just after reaching port at Cádiz. Some said he was poisoned by his successor. (The two were enemies and Gálvez had never forgiven him for occupying the viceroyalty in his stead.) However, this was never substantiated.

== Family and descendants ==
Mayorga's father, Martín Díaz de Mayorga Sorripas, son of a colonel and brigadier himself of the Royal Armies, had fought in the War of the Spanish Succession from 1701 to 1714. After the triumph of Philip V, brigadier Mayorga was sent to Barcelona as Catalonia had supported the Austrian Archduke Charles, who would later become emperor under the name of Charles VI. While in Barcelona, brigadier Mayorga married Ana Ferrer I Pou, a Catalan woman, and together fathered Martin de Mayorga Ferrer.

Mayorga Ferrer was married to Josefa Valcárcel y Daoiz of Pamplona, Navarre, and had three children together. However, as governor of the Captaincy General of Guatemala, Mayorga fathered multiple mestizo children out of wedlock with indigenous women in Guatemala and Nicaragua during the nearly six years he governed Central America. Due to his infidelity, many of Mayorga's descendants are found throughout Guatemala and Nicaragua through his mestizo offspring, whereas his descendants through his three children with Josefa are found in Spain. Most of Mayorga's descendants are found in Spain, Guatemala and Nicaragua.

Armando Mayorga (Spain)

Patricio Mayorga Espinales (Nicaragua)

Roberto Mayorga (Guatemala)
