= William Prowse =

Rear-Admiral William Prowse CB
- Born: 1752
- Died: March 23, 1826 (aged 73–74); St Pancras, London
- Military career
- Allegiance: United Kingdom of Great Britain and Ireland
- Branch: Royal Navy
- Service years: 1771 – 1826
- Rank: Rear-Admiral
- Commands: HMS Raven; HMS Salvador del Mundo; HMS Prince of Wales; HMS Sirius; HMS Theseus
- Conflicts: American Revolutionary War; Battle of Grenada; Battle of Martinique; French Revolutionary Wars; Glorious First of June; Battle of Cape St Vincent; Napoleonic Wars; Battle of Cape Finisterre; Battle of Trafalgar
- Awards: Companion of the Order of the Bath

Rear-Admiral William Prowse CB (1752 – 23 March 1826) was a Royal Navy officer who served in the American War of Independence and French Revolutionary and Napoleonic Wars. Rising from humble origins and joining the navy as an able seaman, he had a highly active career, serving under some of the most famous naval commanders of the Age of Sail, and participating in some of their greatest victories. He was at Grenada and Martinique under Byron and Rodney, the Glorious First of June under Howe; and commanded ships at Cape St Vincent under Jervis, Cape Finisterre under Calder and Trafalgar under Nelson. He finished his career by serving with distinction in the Mediterranean, and died with the rank of rear-admiral.

== Family and early life ==
Prowse appears to have been of very humble origins, little is known about his birth or childhood, but he appears to have been born to a working-class Devon family of Cornish origin in 1752. He probably went to sea aboard merchant ships initially, but is first recorded in the Navy on 13 November 1771 as an able seaman aboard the Hamoaze guardship, the 74-gun HMS Dublin. Prowse remained aboard her for the next four years, only leaving her on 26 February 1776. His next posting was to the 74-gun HMS Albion, which he joined in November that year, being rated as midshipman and master's mate on 31 August 1778 by Captain George Bowyer. Prowse and the Albion were by then serving on the North American station, and went on to see action at the Battle of Grenada on 6 July 1779 and the Battle of Martinique on 17 April 1780. Prowse was wounded in one of the clashes at Martinique, being struck in the head by a large splinter.

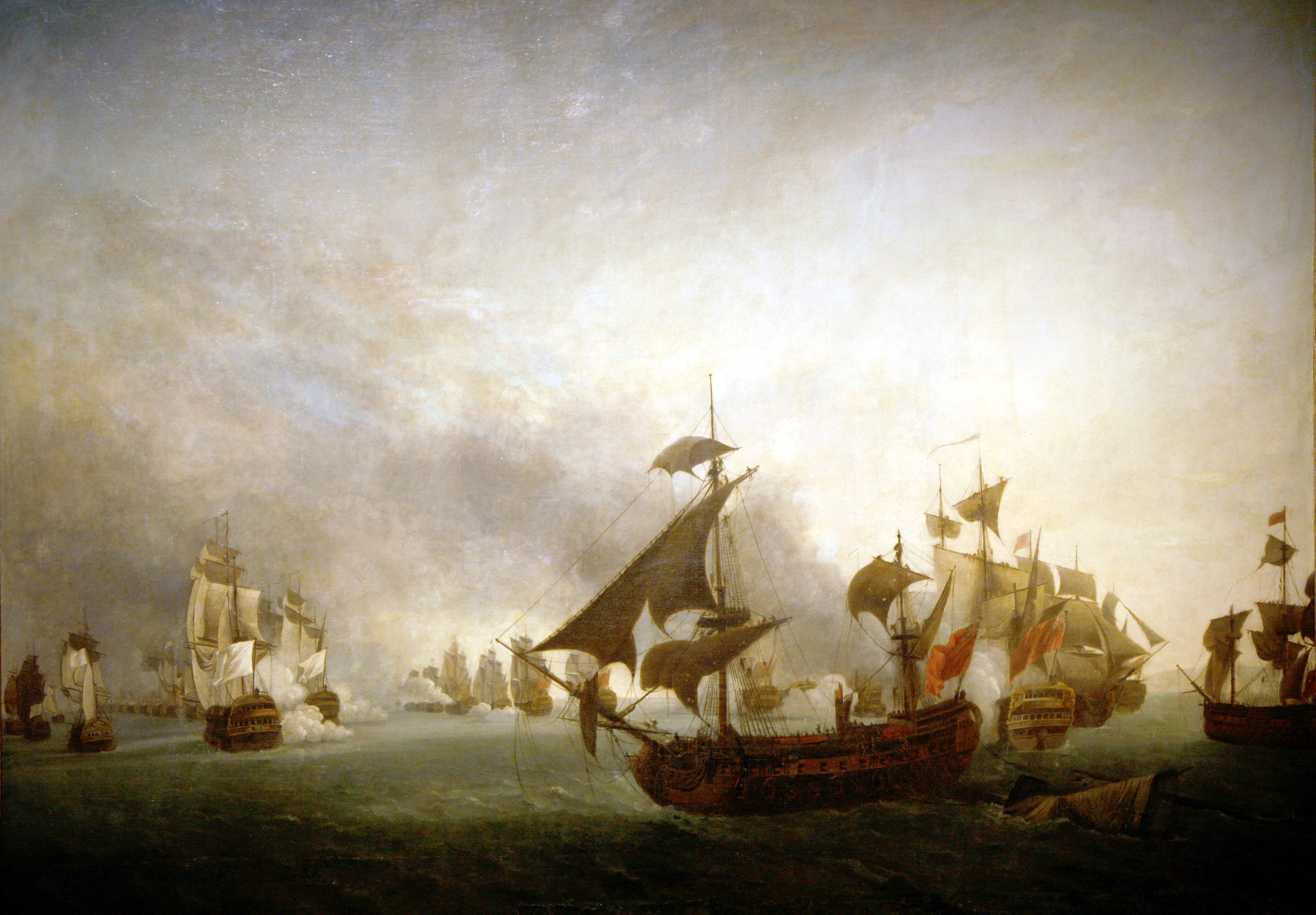
Jean-François Hue's depiction of the Battle of Grenada, one of Prowse's earliest experiences of fleet engagements.

The Albion was paid off on 21 December 1781 and having passed his examination for lieutenancy on 17 January 1782 and by 6 December 1782 he had received his commission and was on 22 December 1782 appointed to the 90-gun second rate HMS Atlas under Captain George Vandeput. Prowse was moved again on 14 April to join the 28-gun sixth rate HMS Cyclops under Captain Brabazon Christian. Prowse continued to serve off North America until March 1784. Prowse then disappears from naval records, and may have spent several years on merchant ships. He briefly reappears in 1787, when tensions with the Netherlands led to his return to service under his old patron Captain Bowyer, now serving on the 74-gun HMS Bellona, but again left the service when the crisis had passed. The Nootka Sound crisis in 1790 led to another mobilisation of the fleet and Prowse returned to the navy, initially serving aboard the 98-gun HMS Barfleur and then aboard the 64-gun HMS Stately under Captain Robert Calder. The last few years of peace for Prowse were spent aboard Lord Hood's flagship at Portsmouth, the 90-gun HMS Duke, from August 1791 until January 1793.

== French Revolutionary and Napoleonic Wars ==
The outbreak of war with France in February 1793 saw Prowse being appointed, on 20 March 1793, to the 90-gun HMS Prince, commanded by Captain Cuthbert Collingwood and flying the flag of Prowse's old commander, now Rear-Admiral Bowyer. He followed both Collingwood and Bowyer when they moved aboard Prowse's old ship the Barfleur on 28 December 1793, Prowse becoming the sixth lieutenant. The Barfleur went on to be part of Lord Howe's fleet, and was present at the Glorious First of June where Bowyer lost a leg, and Prowse too was wounded in the leg when a shot hit and dismounted the gun he was attempting to aim, and tore away part of his thigh. He apparently had to have his leg amputated.

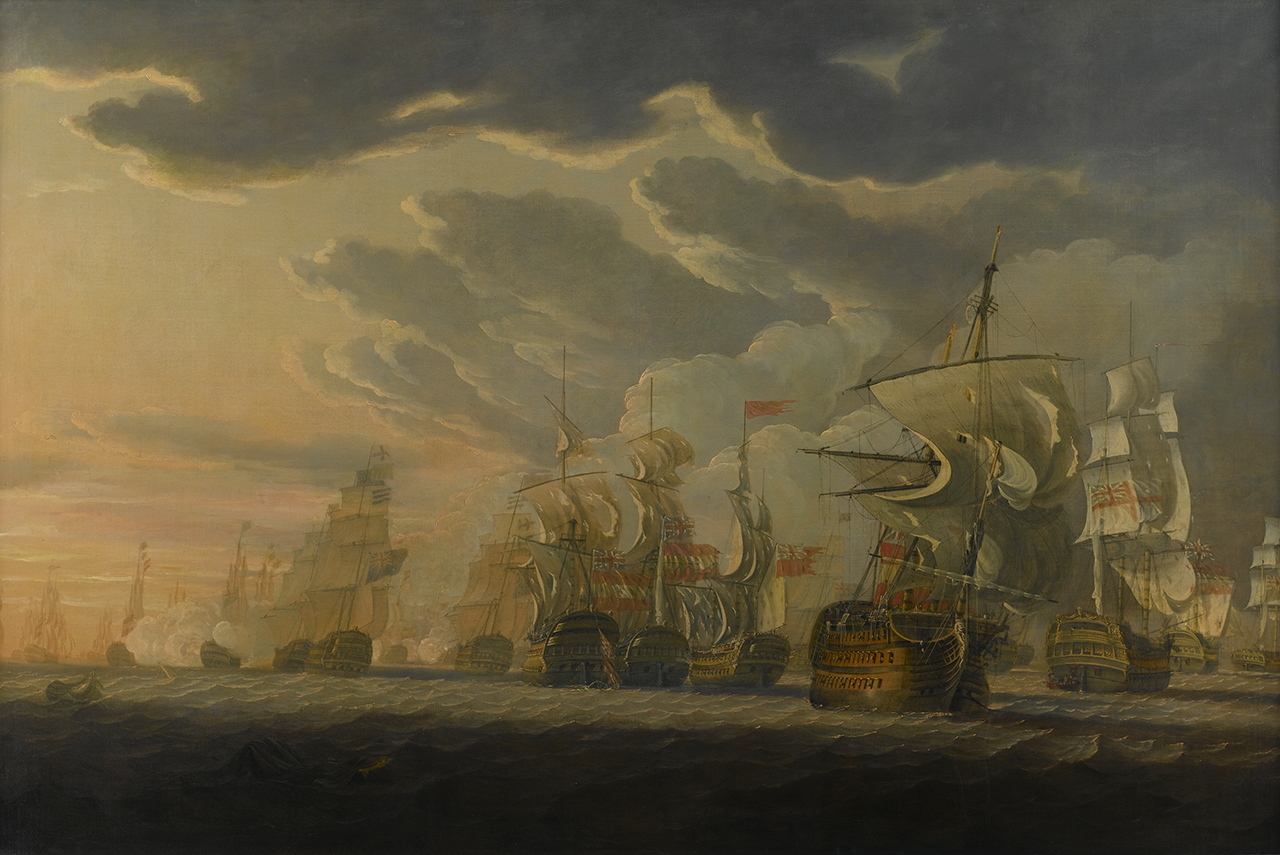
The Battle of Cape St Vincent, 14 February 1797 by Robert Cleveley. Prowse narrowly avoided being engaged by several Spanish ships of the line.

He was invalided ashore, but recovered quickly and returned to service aboard Robert Calder's 74-gun HMS Theseus as his first lieutenant. Calder and the Theseus sailed to the West Indies and after carrying out several minor engagements with French shore batteries, returned to Britain as a convoy escort in July 1795. Calder and Prowse transferred aboard the 32-gun fifth rate HMS Lively and sailed to the Mediterranean to join Sir John Jervis aboard his flagship HMS Victory. Jervis appointed Prowse to his first independent command, the 14-gun sloop HMS Raven on 20 October 1796. Raven was with Jervis's fleet at the Battle of Cape St Vincent on 14 February 1797, and was used to repeat signals. She also, in company with four frigates and another sloop, gave chase to the Spanish four-decker Santísima Trinidad but they eventually lost her. For his services Jervis promoted Prowse to post-captain on 6 March 1797 and appointed him to command the captured Spanish prize Salvador del Mundo. Prowse took his ship home for paying-off in November but since no ship could be found for him, went on half-pay.

He finally returned to active service when Rear-Admiral Sir Robert Calder asked for him to be his flag-captain aboard his flagship HMS Prince of Wales. He briefly served in the West Indies, and returned to Britain on the Peace of Amiens in 1802. With the Prince of Wales paid off, Prowse was given command of the 36-gun frigate HMS Sirius in August 1802, where he took part in the blockades of the French and Spanish coasts. With the resumption of the war in May 1803 Sirius was deployed into the English Channel and the Bay of Biscay, becoming part of Calder's fleet in 1804.

=== Battle of Cape Finisterre ===
With Calder's fleet patrolling off Cape Finisterre in anticipation of the arrival of the combined Franco-Spanish fleet under Pierre-Charles Villeneuve, Prowse and the Sirius, in company with HMS Egyptienne were despatched to scout for the enemy. Villeneuve had been reported as having arrived in the area and on 22 July Prowse located the allied feet, with the frigate Siréne at the rear, towing a captured merchant. Prowse closed on the Siréne, intending to cut her off and board her, but Villeneuve ordered his ships to wear in succession and reverse their course to meet Calder's advancing fleet. Prowse suddenly found himself facing the entire combined fleet, which was fast bearing down on him, led by the Spanish Admiral Federico Gravina aboard the Argonauta. With his tiny frigate heavily outclassed, Prowse began to beat away to leeward as the fleet passed him on the opposite tack. Gravina, aware of the convention that a ship of the line did not open fire on a frigate, ordered that the Sirius not be fired upon and the next Spanish ships also held fire. Shortly afterwards Calder's van came into range of the fleet and a general action ensued, whereby the Sirius was fired on by the España and had two men killed and three wounded. After the battle Prowse was sent to Plymouth with the captured Spanish 74-gun Firme in tow.

=== Nelson and Trafalgar ===
Villeneuve led the rest of his fleet into Cádiz on 21 August 1805, and the Sirius was sent to form part of the British fleet blockading them there. With Nelson's arrival to take command of the fleet, the main body was moved out to sea, with a chain of four frigates and four ships of the line established to observe the fleet in Cadiz and transmit signals about their movements to the British fleet. Sirius was the closest to the port and at first light on 19 October it was observed that the enemy were preparing to put to sea. Sirius immediately signalled the next frigate in the line, Henry Blackwood's HMS Euryalus, 'Enemy have their topsails hoisted'. Thus Prowse began the process that would lead to the interception of the combined fleet two days later. An hour later at 7 a.m. Sirius ran up three flags to signal code number 370, 'Enemy ships are coming out of port or getting under sail'. The signal was repeated down the line, reaching Nelson 48 miles away aboard HMS Victory at 9.30 a.m.

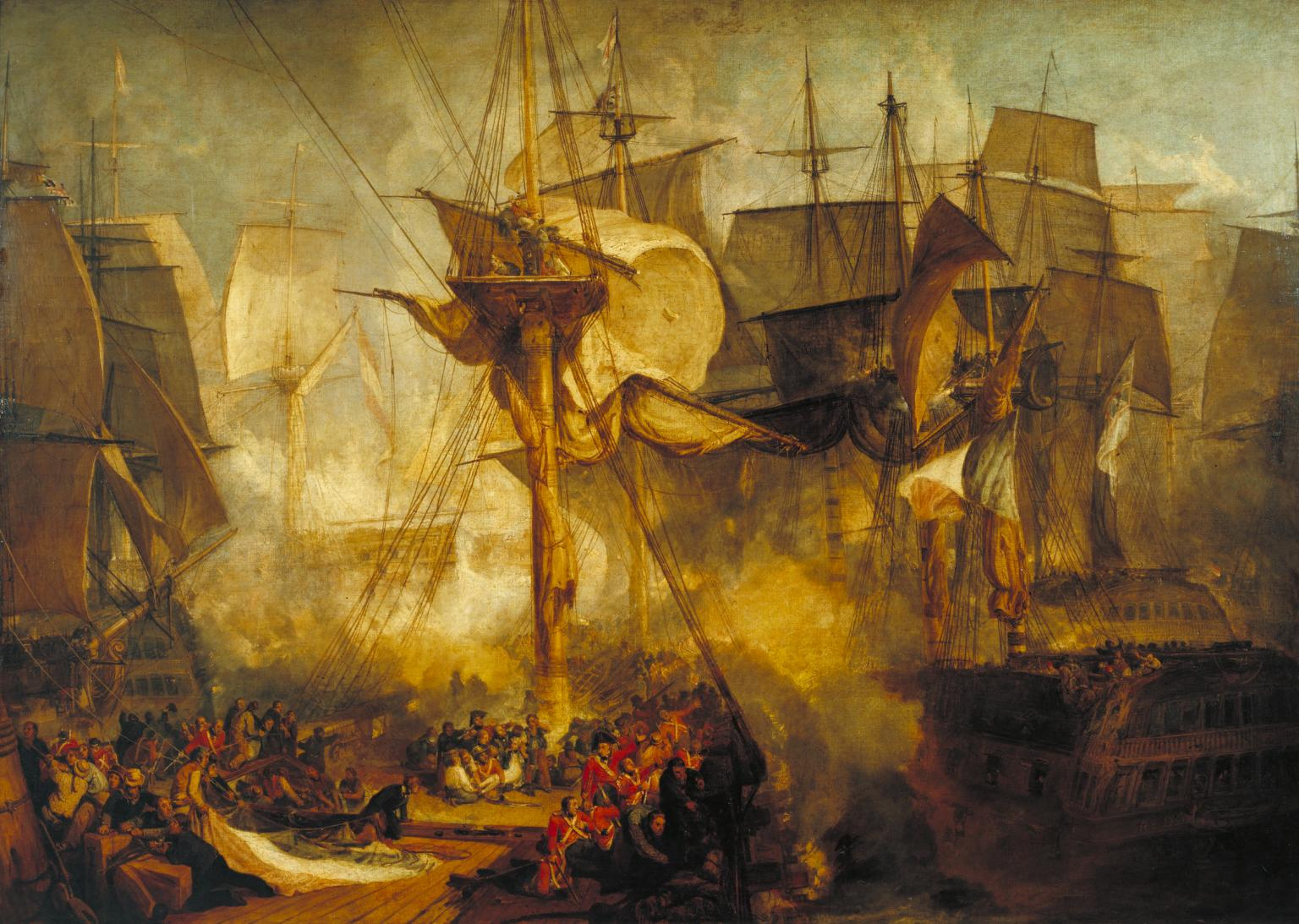
The Battle of Trafalgar, as seen from the mizzen starboard shrouds of the Victory, by J. M. W. Turner. While not directly engaged in the fighting, Prowse played an important role both before and after the battle.

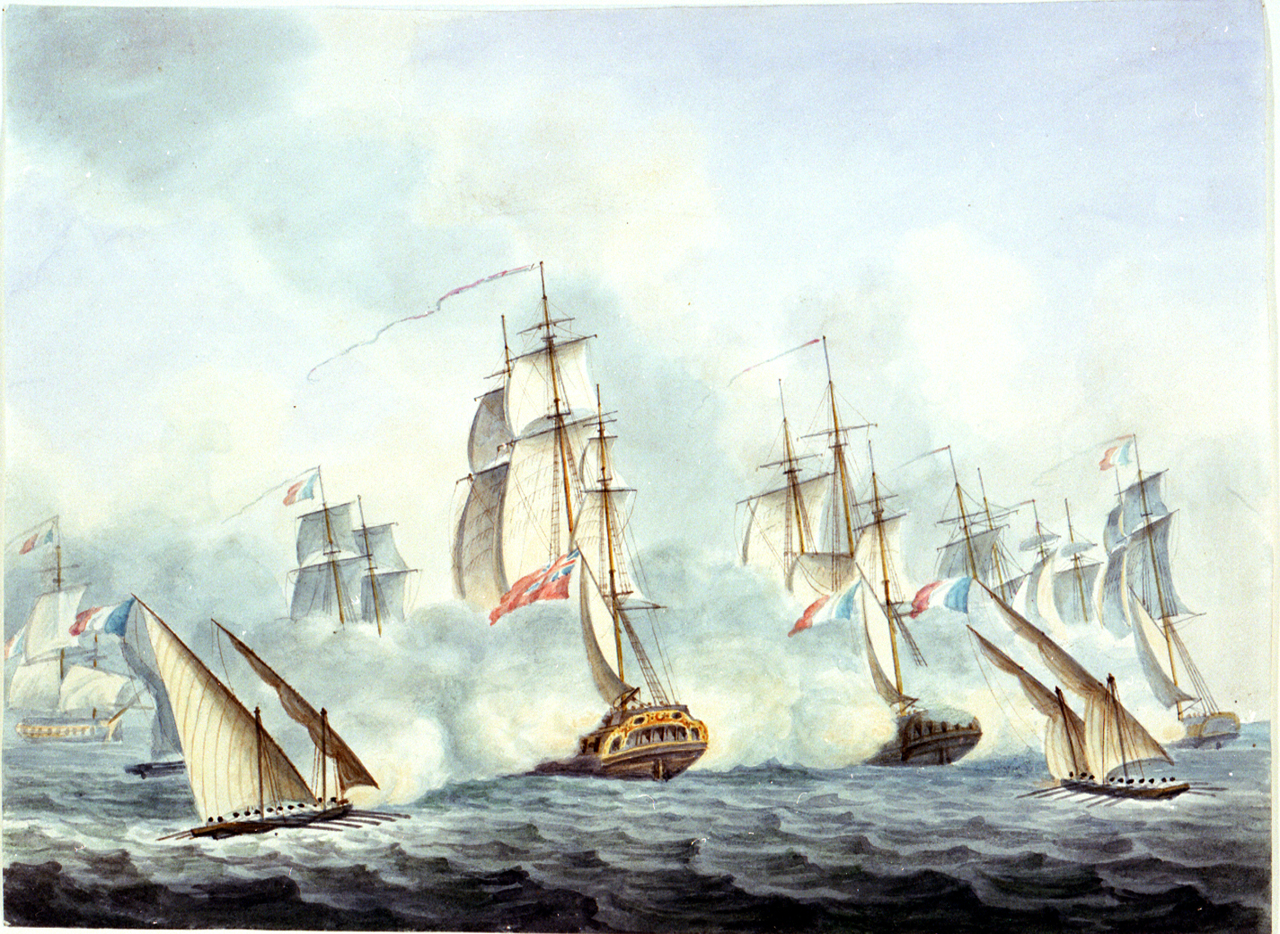
Sirius engaging a French flotilla off the mouth of the River Tiber on 17 April 1806. The victory was one of Prowse's last engagements.

The next morning, 20 October 1805, a strange sail was reported off the entrance to the harbour. Prowse asked for and was given permission by Blackwood to investigate, and closed on the stranger. By the time this had been achieved the 74-gun Héros had come within range and opened fire. Sirius nevertheless stopped the stranger with a shot across her bow and sent an officer over to inspect her. It was determined that the ship in question was a neutral American merchant, and she was allowed to continue on her way. Prowse recovered the boat and hauled away from the French warship. The entire combined fleet had finally put to sea by 10 a.m., whereupon a burst of rainy squalls caused the frigates to lose sight of it until midday.

Prowse and the other frigates continued to shadow the fleet until 7.30 a.m. on 21 October, when Nelson signalled the four frigate captains; Prowse of the Sirius, Blackwood of the Euryalus, Capel of the Phoebe, and Dundas of the Naiad, to come aboard the Victory. There they received their orders for the battle, which were to take station windward of the Victory and so repeat his signals to the rest of the fleet. They were also to observe the progress of the battle, report on escaping ships, take over surrendered enemy ships that had not been taken and take in tow dismasted British ships or their prizes. They then all went below and witnessed Nelson's will. Departing Victory to return to Sirius as the former closed on the enemy line, Prowse said goodbye to his nephew, Captain Charles Adair, who was commander of the marines on Victory.

During the battle Sirius maintained her station out of the immediate battle, and suffered no casualties. After its end, she moved in and took the Victory under tow, but as the weather worsened she handed over to the larger 64-gun HMS Polyphemus. The week after the battle Prowse was sent into Cadiz with a note from Collingwood to the Marquis de Solana, requesting the use of the town's facilities for the Spanish prisoners.

== Continued service and later years ==
Prowse remained aboard the Sirius in the Mediterranean serving under Vice-Admiral Collingwood. On 17 April 1806 he engaged a French flotilla near Civitavecchia off the mouth of the River Tiber. The flotilla consisted of the 18-gun corvette Bergère, three armed brigs, a bomb vessel, a cutter and three gunboats. The Bergère held off the Sirius until Prowse forced her surrender. For this action Prowse was mentioned in despatches and awarded a sword from the Lloyd's Patriotic Fund. The Sirius was paid off in May 1808 and in March 1810 Prowse took command of the 74-gun HMS Theseus. He was nominated a Companion of the Bath on 4 June 1815, and a Colonel of the Royal Marines on 12 August 1819. He commanded her in the North Sea until 23 December 1813, after which he went onshore and saw no further active service. He was promoted to rear-admiral on 19 July 1821 and died on 23 March 1826 in St Pancras, London at the age of 72.
