= HMS Tickler =

Several vessels of the British Royal Navy have been named Tickler:

- HMS Tickler (1781) was a purchased brig-sloop that the French captured in 1783.
- Tickler was a gunboat purchased in the West Indies that participated in the capture of Martinique, St. Lucia, and Guadeloupe in early 1794; her fate is currently as obscure as her origins
- HMS Tickler (1794) was a Conquest-class ship-sloop that the Navy sold in 1802.
- HMS Tickler (1804) was a later Archer-class gun-brig that six Danish gunboats captured in 1808.
- HMS Tickler (1808) was the hired armed cutter Lord Duncan, launched at Dover in 1798 that served the Navy from 1798 to 1801; the Navy purchased her in 1808 and she served as HMS Tickler until 1816 when the Navy sold her.
- HMS Tickler (1879) was a Gadfly-class flat-iron gunboat.

== See also ==
- HMS Tickler was a sloop purchased in Honduras for local use as a gunvessel, armed with one 18-pounder gun. She was still listed in 1800 and her ultimate disposition is unknown. Tickler was never commissioned into the Royal Navy, and her officers and crew were civilians.
