= Capture of Río Hondo =

1779 siege

Coordinates: 18°29′16″N 88°19′06″W

Capture of Hondo River
- Part of the American Revolutionary War
Date	1779
Location	Hondo River, Belize
Result	initial British victory, followed by the evacuation of British Honduras

Belligerents
Kingdom of Spain	Kingdom of Great Britain

Commanders and leaders
Roberto Rivas Betancourt (es)	unknown

The Capture of Río Hondo was the result of a Spanish military operation in the autumn of September 1779 against British settlements around the Hondo River in present-day Belize.

== Campaign ==
The Kingdom of Great Britain owned the area south of the Hondo River since the early 18th century. The area was sparsely populated and contained only a number of semi-sedentary settlements of loggers.
After the outbreak of the Anglo-Spanish War (1779–1783), the Spanish launched a number of attacks against these British settlements. Success was very limited and on 22 September the Spanish even suffered a defeat, so the British were not driven out.

However, the British abandoned their colony after the Spanish Capture of Cayo Cocina on the 15 September 1779. The colony was abandoned until 1784 when the British logging rights were confirmed in the 1783 Treaty of Paris..

== See also ==
- Colonial rivalry between Spain and Britain
- English settlement of Belize
- Baymen
