= Macharaviaya =

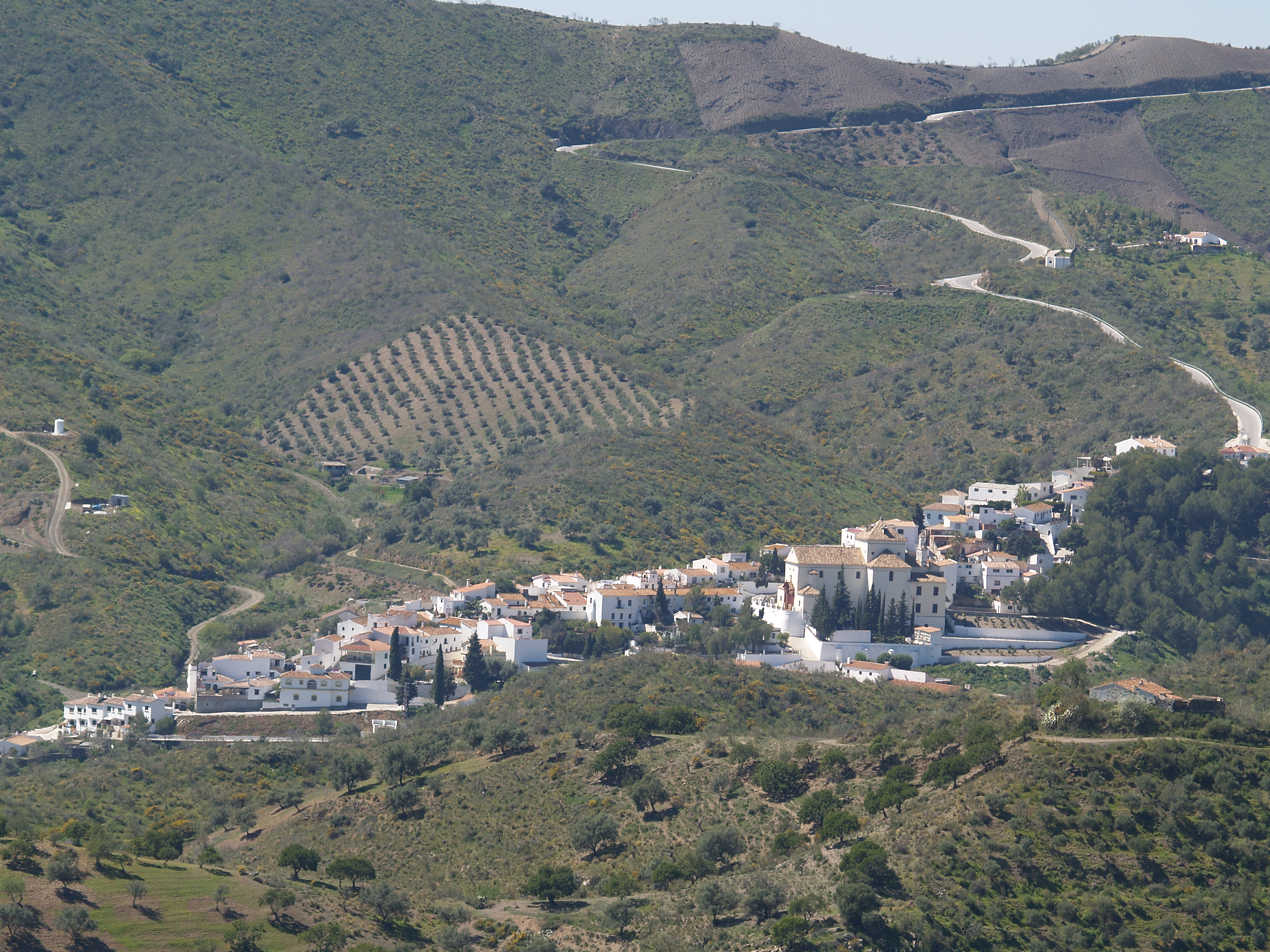

- Coat of arms

- Location in Spain. Macharaviaya (Andalusia) Macharaviaya (Spain)
- Coordinates: 36°45′N 4°12′W
- Sovereign state: Spain
- Autonomous community: Andalusia
- Province: Málaga
- Comarca: La Axarquía

Government
  - Mayor: Antonio Campos Garín

Area
  - Total: 7.24 km^{2} (2.80 sq mi)
- Elevation: 185 m (607 ft)

Population (2025-01-01)
  - Total: 518
  - Density: 71.5/km^{2} (185/sq mi)
- Demonym(s): Macharatungo, Macharatunga
- Time zone: UTC+1 (CET)
  - Summer (DST): UTC+2 (CEST)
- Website: (in Spanish) www.macharaviaya.es

Macharaviaya is a municipality in the province of Málaga in the mountains of the autonomous community of Andalusia in the south of Spain. It is located in the comarca of La Axarquía.

The village was built upon the ruins of an old Moorish settlement. Its name is derived from Arabic: مَشْجَر أَبِي يَحْيى, romanized: mašjar abī yaḥyā, meaning "Abu/Abi Yahya's Farm/Grove". It was the home of the noble Gálvez family, whose descendant Matías de Gálvez y Gallardo had been the viceroy of New Spain. His son Bernardo, who was born in the village, became Governor of Louisiana and captured Baton Rouge, Mobile and Pensacola from the British during the American Revolution. The historical centre of the village has a preservation order on it. Some Spanish and foreign artists, ceramicists, painters and writers live among the villagers.

On July 4th of every year the village celebrates Bernardo de Gálvez's role in the American Revolutionary War, and in particular his part in the Siege of Pensacola, Florida, in 1781. During the siege Gálvez led Spanish, French, and mixed-race free Afro-Cubans to expel the British from the area in support of the American war of independence. The celebration, which thousands of people attend, includes villagers dressing in period costumes, a re-creation of the battle, and fireworks.

Every year in August, Macharaviaya hosts a festival honoring the patron saint of the village, Bernard of Clairvaux.

== Main sights ==
- Church of San Jacinto
- Templete de los Gálvez
- Iglesia mudejar, a local church in Benaque, its tower is the minaret of a former mosque
- Museo de Gálvez

== Gallery ==
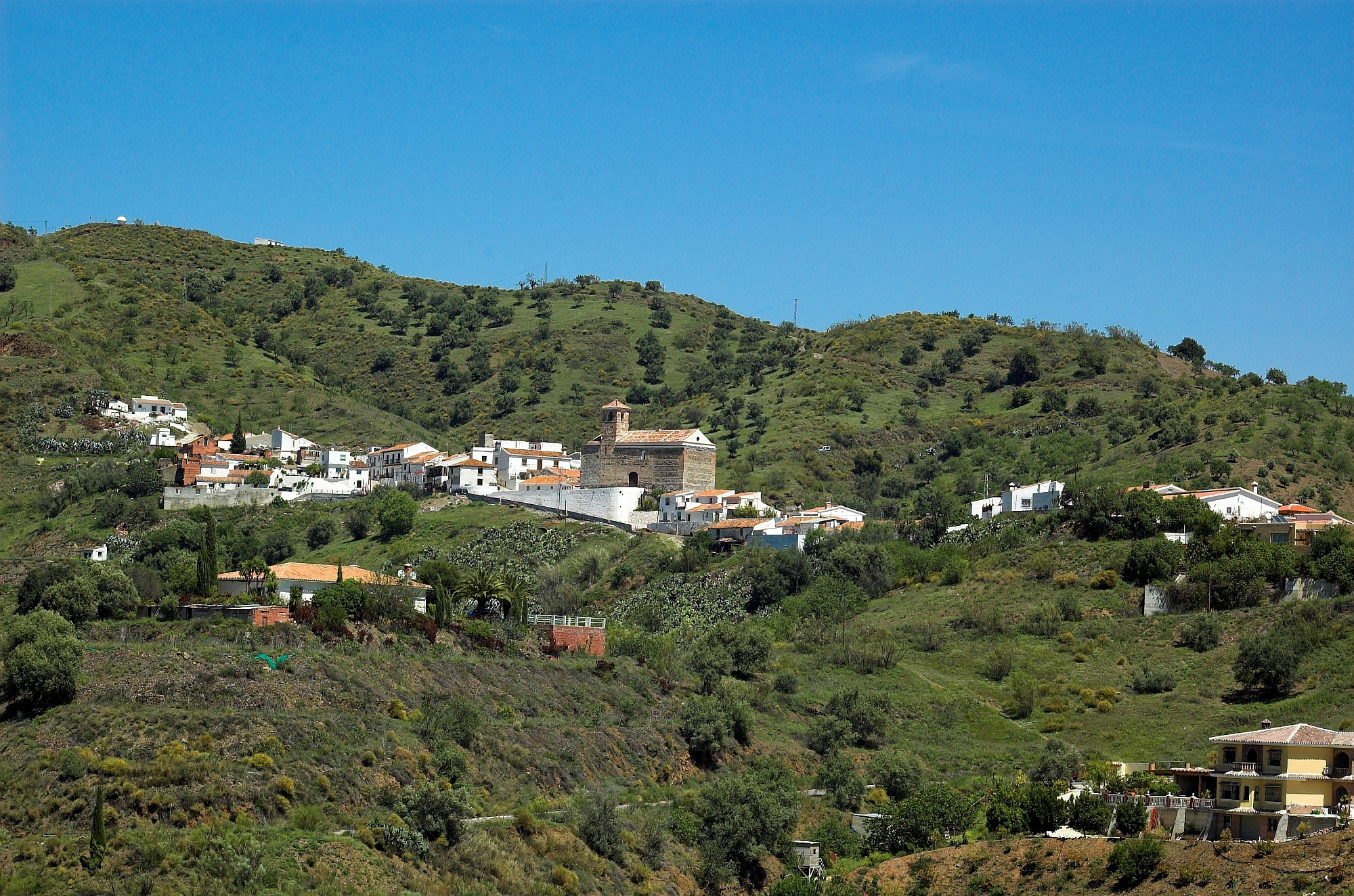
Benaque in Macharaviaya. Town with Iglesia mudejar church (former mosque) in hill background.

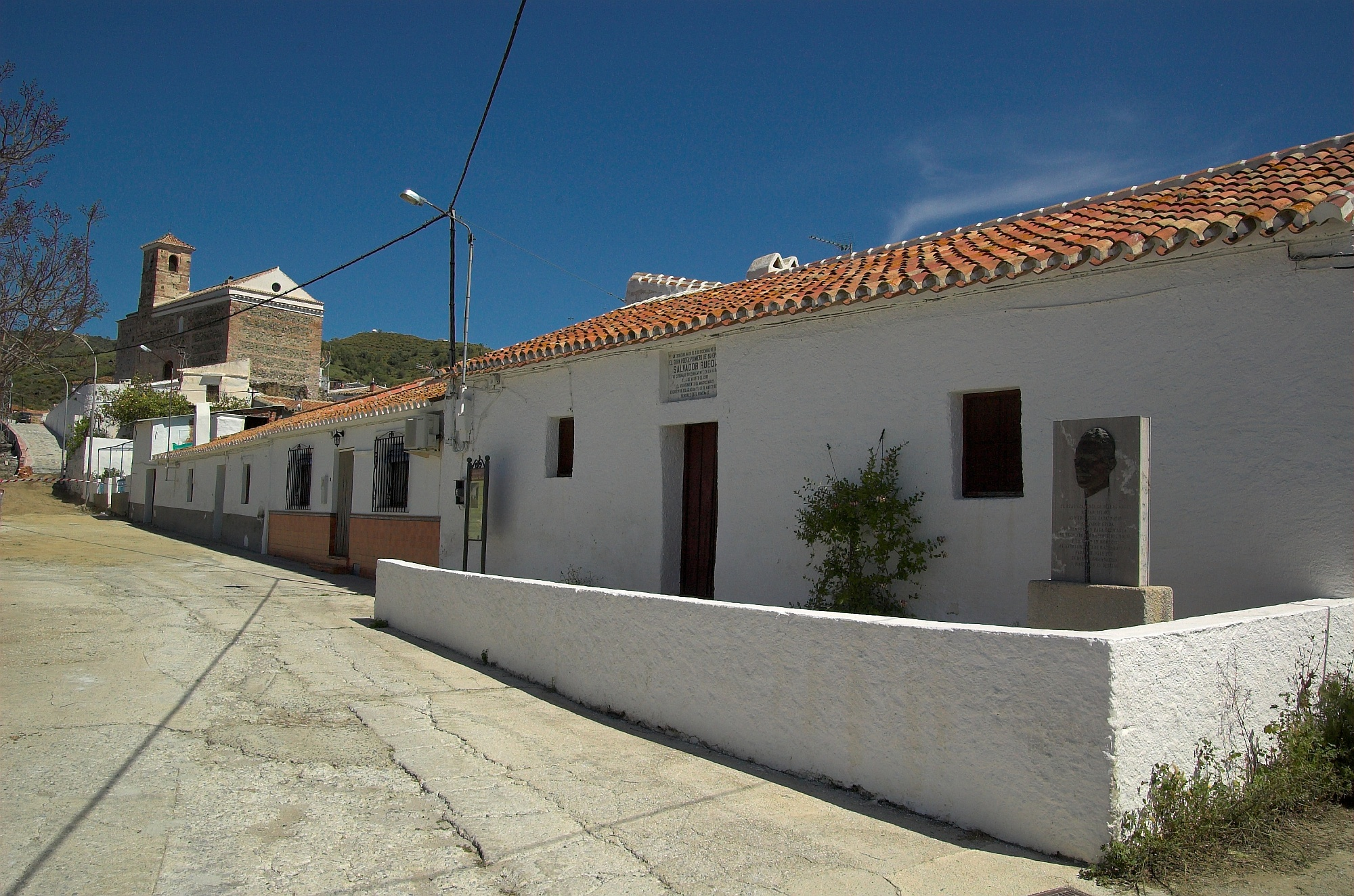
Benaque church neighborhood.

== Twin towns ==
- Pensacola, United States
- Galveston, United States

== See also ==
- List of municipalities in Málaga
