= HMS Swinger (1798) =

History

Great Britain
- Name: HMS Swinger
- Acquired: Purchased in 1798
- Fate: Unknown

General characteristics
- Sail plan: Schooner
- Complement: 25
- Armament: 4 × 6-pounder + 2 × 4-pounder guns

HMS Swinger was a schooner purchased in Honduras in 1798 for local use. She had a crew of 25 men from the "Colonial Troops".

She served in defense of the British colonists at Honduras and participated in the repulse of the Spanish expedition at the Battle of St. George's Caye in September 1798. She was still listed in 1799, but her ultimate disposition is unknown. The Spanish threat having passed, Swinger may have been returned to her former owners not long after 1799.

== See also ==
- HMS Teazer (1798)
