= HMS Towzer =

British gunvessel (1798)

HMS Towzer (or Towser) was a gunvessel purchased in the West Indies in 1798 for the colony at Honduras. She was a sloop armed with one 18-pounder gun and had a crew of 25 men. Like Tickler, she was under the command of a merchant captain, in Towzer's case a Mr. Gelston, who brought with him some of his crew.

She served in defense of the British colonists at Honduras and participated in the repulse of the Spanish expedition at the Battle of St. George's Caye in September 1798. Her ultimate disposition is unknown. The Spanish threat having passed, she may have been sold, r simply returned to her owners.

It is arguable that she deserves the designation "HMS" as Towzer was never commissioned into the Royal Navy, and her officers and crew were civilians, whereas in the case of hired armed vessels, the Navy provided the captain. No other vessel of the Royal Navy ever carried the name Towzer.
