= St. George's Caye =

Island off the coast of Belize

Coordinates: 17°33′11″N 88°4′26″W

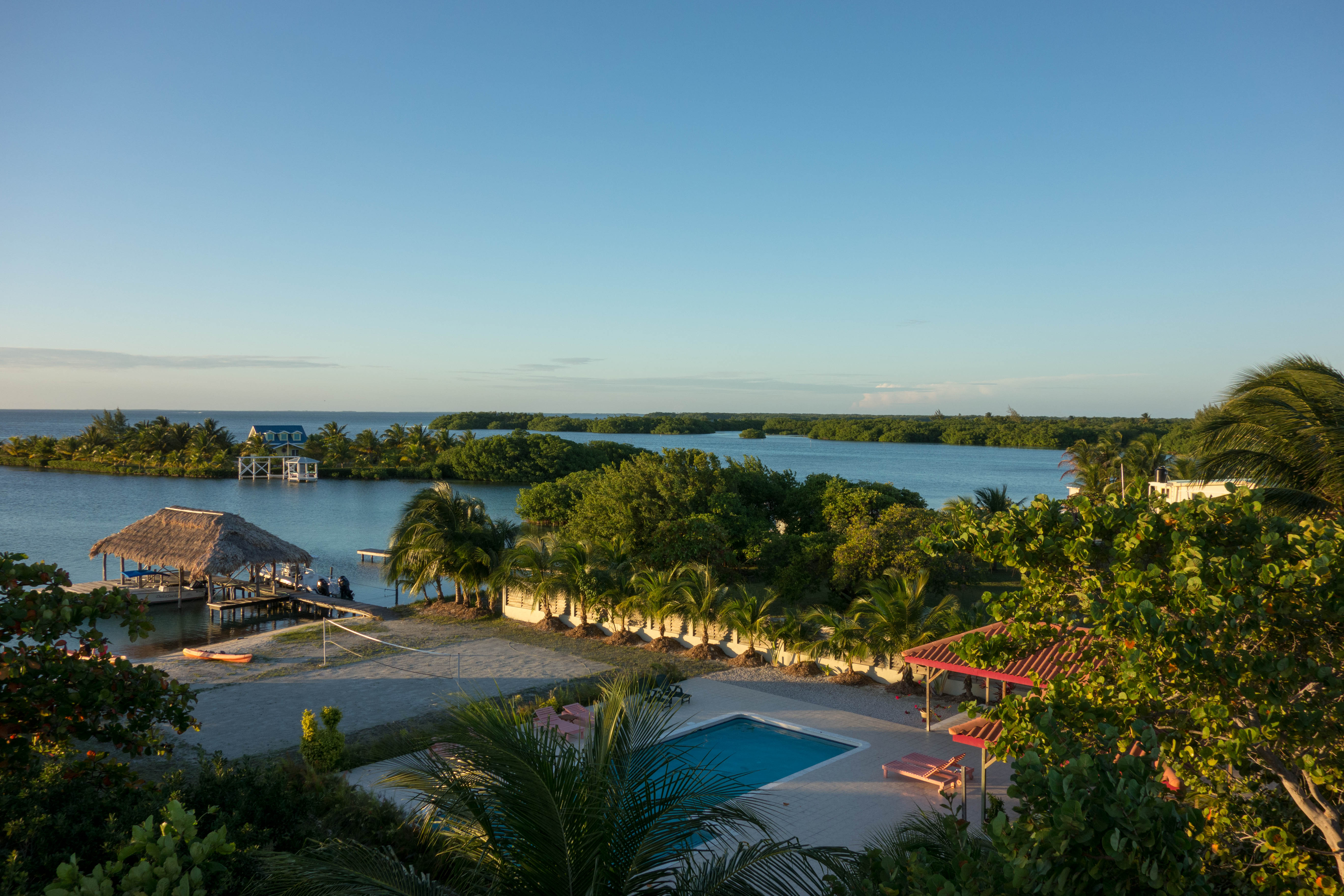
Hotel on St. George's Caye

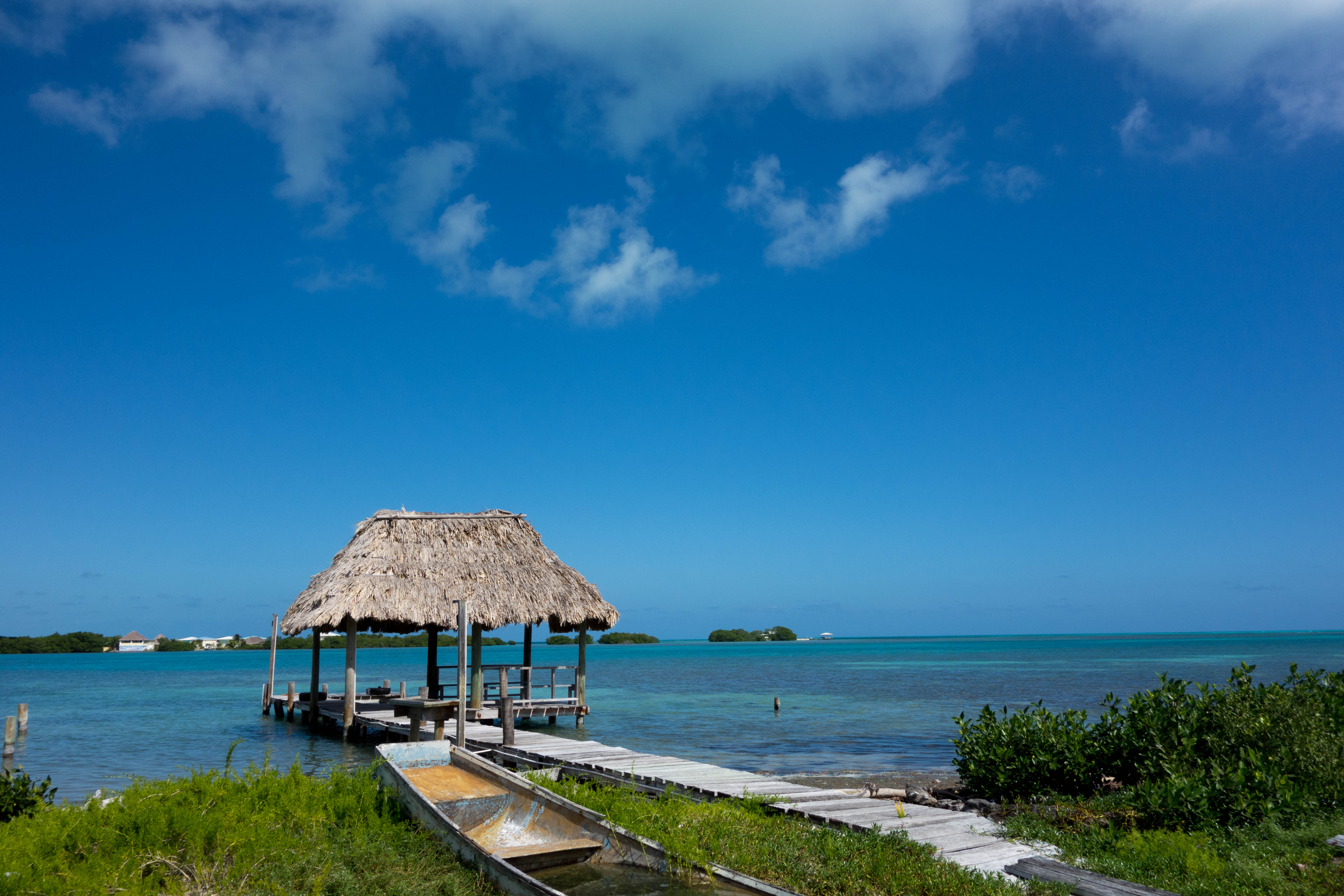
Dock on St. George's Caye

St. George's Caye (Spanish: Cayo San Jorge) is an island in the Caribbean Sea, eight miles east of Belize City. It is part of the Belize District of Belize, Central America. The village on the island is also known as St. George's Caye. As of 2000, St. George's Caye had a permanent population of about 20 people.

St. George's Caye was previously known by the Spaniards as "Cayo Cocina", or "Kitchen Cay". It was settled as a town in 1650, and was the largest settlement in what was then British Honduras in the 17th century and 18th century; however, its importance was eventually eclipsed by the growth of Belize City. St. George's Caye was Belize's first capital in the 1700s. Following Spanish Capture of Cayo Cocina in 1779, from 3 September through 10 September 1798, British settlers fought and defeated a small Spanish fleet sent to drive them from the area; this battle is marked as a national holiday in Belize each September 10 as the Battle of St. George's Caye.

The British Army had an adventure training establishment on the island, allowing members of the British Forces stationed at the nearby British Army Training and Support Unit Belize (BATSUB) and their families a chance to take part in such activities as diving and sailing. However, the army decided to close the BATSUB in the late 20th century.

Aside from several private residences, the island also has St. George's Caye Resort. Resort activities focus on diving, sailing, and snorkeling.

== Demographics ==
At the time of the 2010 census, St. George's Caye had a population of 657. Of these, 45.3% were Creole, 28.2% Mestizo, 6.2% Mixed, 5.5% East Indian, 4.1% Hindu, 2.4% Garifuna, 2.0% Caucasian, 0.3% Mopan Maya, 0.3% Mennonite, 0.2% Lebanese and 2.6% others.
