= National Heritage Library =

Library in Belmopan, Belize

- 17.244649°N 88.771809°W
- Location: Belmopan, Belize
- Established: August 2006

Collection
- Size: 40,000 objects

Other information
- Website: www.bnlsis.org/national-heritage-library-0

The National Heritage Library (NHL) is a library in Belmopan, Belize. Located on Mountain View Boulevard, adjacent to the Museum of Archeology. It contains an extensive non-circulating collection of materials about Belize and Belizeans with some 20,000 materials in the collection. It also has much archive material including housing development plans, maps, private industry annual reports, and past and current national and local newspapers including the Amandala, Belize Reporter and the Belize Billboard. It also has a collection of digitized books and over 1500 videos of local news broadcasts and documentaries.
