= HMS Mermaid (1798) =

Gunvessel of the Royal Navy

HMS Mermaid was a gunvessel purchased in Honduras in 1798 for local use. She was sloop-rigged, armed with one long 9-pounder gun and had a crew of 25 men from the "Colonial Troops".

She served in defence of the British colonists at Honduras and participated in the repulse of the Spanish expedition at the Battle of St. George's Caye in September 1798. In 1800, after the Spanish threat had passed, she was sold.

It is arguable whether she deserves the designation "HMS", as Mermaid was never commissioned into the Royal Navy, and her officers and crew were civilians. Even in the case of "His Majesty's hired armed vessels", the Navy provided the captain.
