= HMS Teazer (1798) =

History

Great Britain
- Name: Teazer
- Acquired: purchased 1798

General characteristics
- Type: Schooner
- Complement: 25
- Armament: 6 × 4-pounder guns in 1798

HMS Teazer (or Teaser) was a schooner purchased in Honduras in 1798 for local use. She was armed with six 4-pounder guns and had a crew of 25 men from the "Colonial Troops".

Teazer served in defense of the British colonists at Honduras and participated in the repulse of the Spanish expedition at the Battle of St. George's Caye in September 1798. Her ultimate disposition is unknown. The Spanish threat having passed, she may have been returned to her former owners.

It is arguable as to whether she deserves the designation "HMS" as Teazer was never commissioned into the Royal Navy, and her officers and crew were civilians, whereas in the case of hired armed vessels, the Royal Navy provided the captain.

An armed schooner Teazer was driven ashore in a hurricane at Bridgetown, Barbados, on 23 July 1813. However, there is no chain of evidence that links the schooner that was lost to the 1798 schooner.

== See also ==
- HMS Swinger (1798)
