= Thomas Dundas (Royal Navy officer) =

Vice-Admiral Sir Thomas Dundas KCB
- Born: c. 1765
- Died: 29 March 1841; Reading, Berkshire
- Military career
- Allegiance: United Kingdom of Great Britain and Ireland
- Branch: Royal Navy
- Service years: 1778–1841
- Rank: Vice-Admiral
- Commands: HMS Prompte; HMS Solebay; HMS Naiad; HMS Africa; HMS Vengeur; HMS Bulwark
- Conflicts: Battle of Trafalgar
- Awards: Knight Commander of the Order of the Bath

Vice-Admiral Sir Thomas Dundas KCB (c. 1765 – 29 March 1841) was a Royal Navy officer who served in the American War of Independence and the French Revolutionary and Napoleonic Wars. An effective frigate captain he made a number of small captures, but did not see action in any major fleet clashes, until he was present at the Battle of Trafalgar in 1805. He played an important role in relaying signals before the battle, and in towing dismasted British ships to safety afterwards. He had a largely uneventful career thereafter, rising through the ranks and eventually dying a vice-admiral.

== Early life ==
Little is known about Dundas's early life, but he appears to have been born in or around 1765, and to have joined the navy in 1778, during the American War of Independence. He was promoted to lieutenant on 15 July 1793, shortly after the outbreak of the French Revolutionary War, with one of his earliest commands being the sloop HMS Merlin. His next promotion was to commander on 2 September 1795, and he was then raised to post-captain on 9 July 1798. Dundas received command of the 20-gun sixth rate HMS Prompte shortly afterwards and in 1799 he captured a valuable Spanish whaling ship. In March 1799 he captured a Spanish warship, the Urca Cargadora, pierced for 26 guns, but only mounting 12. He was then moved to HMS Solebay, and escorted a convoy of merchantmen to the Mediterranean, returning to Britain on 2 July 1802.

== Frigate captain ==
With the end of the Peace of Amiens in 1803 Dundas returned to sea in 1804 in command of the 36-gun fifth rate HMS Naiad. He was initially assigned to patrol off the west coast of Spain and in the English Channel, where he captured several prizes. In late 1804 he captured a Spanish ship worth over 200,000 dollars, and also helped in the capture of the privateers Fanny and Superb. The Naiad was also involved in an engagement in the Bay of Gibraltar with a flotilla of Spanish gunboats. In mid-August 1805 Dundas had a narrow escape when he came across a large fleet off northern Spain, which challenged the Naiad using British codes. This was in fact the combined fleet under Pierre-Charles Villeneuve, heading for Ferrol. Naiad managed to escape, evading fire from the lead French frigates, and on 20 August Dundas fell in with Vice-Admiral Sir Robert Calder's squadron, on its way to blockade Ferrol.

Calder's force was then sent on to join the ships blockading the combined fleet in Cádiz under Vice-Admiral Cuthbert Collingwood, and Dundas used his time here to harass enemy supply ships. With the arrival on 28 September of Vice-Admiral Horatio Nelson to take command of the fleet, the main British force withdrew over the horizon. Nelson deployed his frigates, including Dundas's Naiad, and several ships of the line to provide a line by which the enemy fleet could be observed and signals transmitted back to him. When the combined fleet put to sea on 19 October Naiad was third in the line, between the frigate HMS Phoebe and the 74-gun third rate HMS Defence. As the combined fleet approached the British over the next couple of days, Naiad and the other frigates shadowed it, reporting on its movements.

== Nelson and Trafalgar ==
As the two fleets came within sight on the morning of 21 October, Nelson summoned the four frigate captains, Dundas of the Naiad, Prowse of the Sirius, Blackwood of the Euryalus and Capel of the Phoebe, to come aboard his flagship HMS Victory. There they received their orders for the battle, which were to take station windward of the Victory and so repeat his signals to the rest of the fleet. They were also to observe the progress of the battle, report on escaping ships, take over surrendered enemy ships that had not been taken and take in tow dismasted British ships or their prizes. They then all went below and witnessed Nelson's will. The Naiad duly remained out of the general melee, did not open fire, and sustained no casualties. After the battle she took William Hargood's damaged and dismasted HMS Belleisle in tow.

=== Towing the Belleisle ===
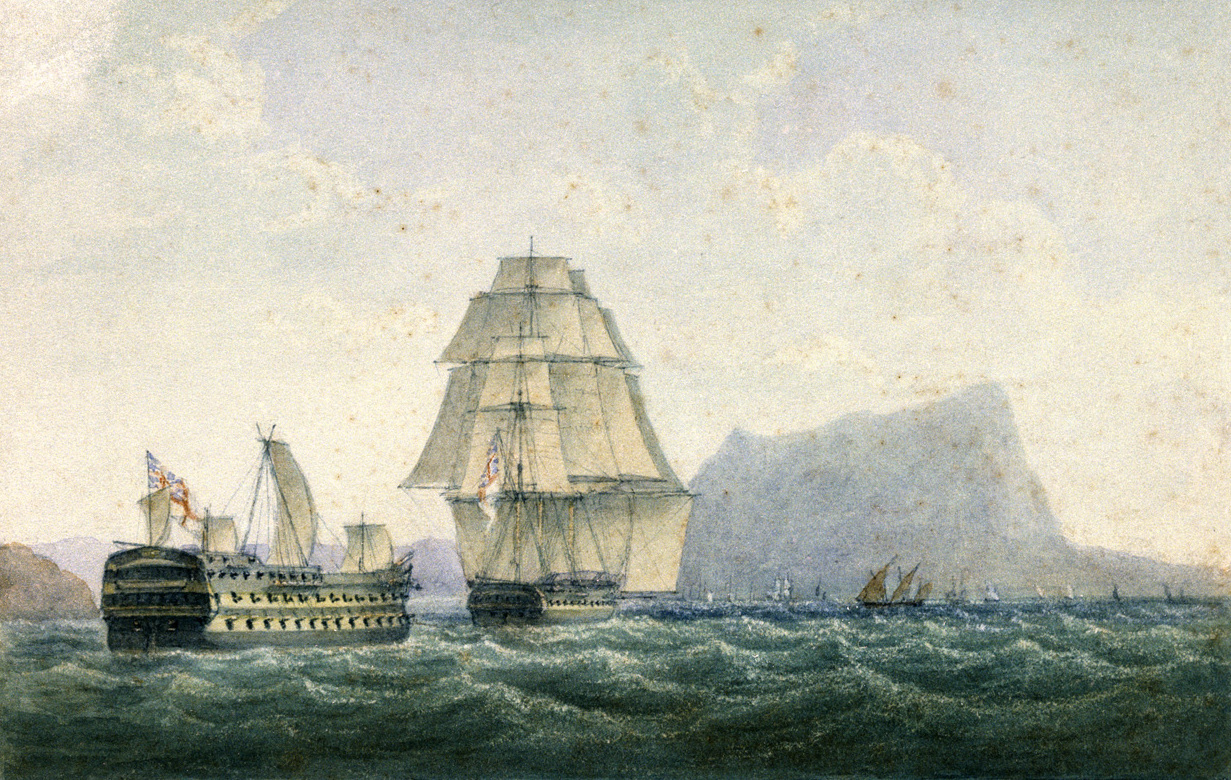
Naiad tows the Belleisle towards Gibraltar, 23 October 1805. A jury rig is visible on the battered Belleisle, while Naiad carries a full spread of canvas.

Dundas's most significant challenge of the battle was navigating both the Naiad and the crippled Belleisle through the rising storm to the safety of Gibraltar. By 22 October they had lost contact with most of the rest of the fleet, but Dundas persevered, several times having to haul the ships off the coast as strong winds threatened to drive them onshore. Better weather on the morning of 23 October allowed Dundas to make more sail, but the return of the gale in the afternoon placed both ships in difficulties. During the afternoon the crews had a fright when a ship-of-the-line was spotted speeding up from the south. At first it seemed that it could be one of the squadron that had escaped from Trafalgar under Pierre Dumanoir le Pelley, but after an exchange of signals the mystery ship was revealed to be HMS Donegal, rushing northwards to join the fleet. Naiad and Belleisle battled the weather for the rest of the day; several times the tow rope snapped, but it was reattached by the Naiad sailing close enough to the unmanageable hulk of the Belleisle for a rope to be thrown across, as the sea was too rough to risk launching boats. At 1940 that evening the two ships collided, damaging Naiad's jolly boat and smashing away most of the starboard quarter gallery.

Dundas was eventually forced to haul away from the Belleisle as night fell, and try to save his own ship. During the night the Naiad's larboard topsail sheet blew away, and the reefed topsail sheet was split. The crew were forced to cut away the other sheet to save the yard, but the sheet blew away in the gale. Shortly afterwards the fore topmast staysail was blown to bits. Belleisle was also in a desperate situation, blown almost onto the breakers of the Spanish coast before her crew managed to wear her around. With difficulty she survived the night, and was found when the light came the next morning by Dundas, who had a line reattached. He steered straight for Gibraltar, and came within sight of the rock by midday, despite having been fired on by the Spanish battery at Tarifa. Dundas took Naiad in and anchored at 1330 that afternoon, while the Belleisle was warped into the mole. Dundas subsequently was awarded a sword from the Lloyd's Patriotic Fund for his services at Trafalgar.

== Later years ==
Dundas remained in command of Naiad until 1808, serving in the blockade of Rochefort. Dundas went on to command the 64-gun HMS Africa, another Trafalgar veteran, and the 74-gun HMS Vengeur. He commissioned HMS Bulwark on 28 March 1822, and was stationed at Plymouth. During his career Dundas is said to have invented a type of inflammable ball,

... applicable for besieging a town, and peculiar for its small weight, by which means may be thrown to a great distance; and it takes fire on a very curious plan: it spreads a flame on three distinct openings, which is so strong, that the fire extends a full yard in length from the ball itself, and is so powerful, that anything under, over, or near, cannot escape its effects.

Dundas was advanced to rear-admiral on 27 May 1825, vice-admiral on 10 January 1837 and appointed and invested as a Knight Commander of the Order of the Bath on 13 September 1831. He died in Reading, Berkshire on 29 March 1841. The sword he received for Trafalgar is currently held in the collections of the National Maritime Museum.

== Sources ==
- Adkin, Mark (2007). The Trafalgar Companion: A Guide to History's Most Famous Sea Battle and the Life of Admiral Lord Nelson. London: Aurum Press. ISBN 978-1-84513-018-3.
- Clayton, Tim; Craig, Phil (2004). Trafalgar: The Men, the Battle, the Storm. London: Hodder. ISBN 0-340-83028-X.
- Heathcote, T. A. (2005). Nelson's Trafalgar Captains and their Battles: A Biographical and Historical Dictionary. Barnsley: Pen& Sword Maritime. ISBN 1-84415-182-4.
- Urban, Sylvanus (1841). The Gentleman's Magazine. Vol. 171 July–December. F. Jefferies.
- Winfield, Rif (2007). British Warships of the Age of Sail 1714–1792: Design, Construction, Careers and Fates. London: Seaforth. ISBN 978-1-86176-295-5.
