= La Gaceta de México =

Spanish newspaper

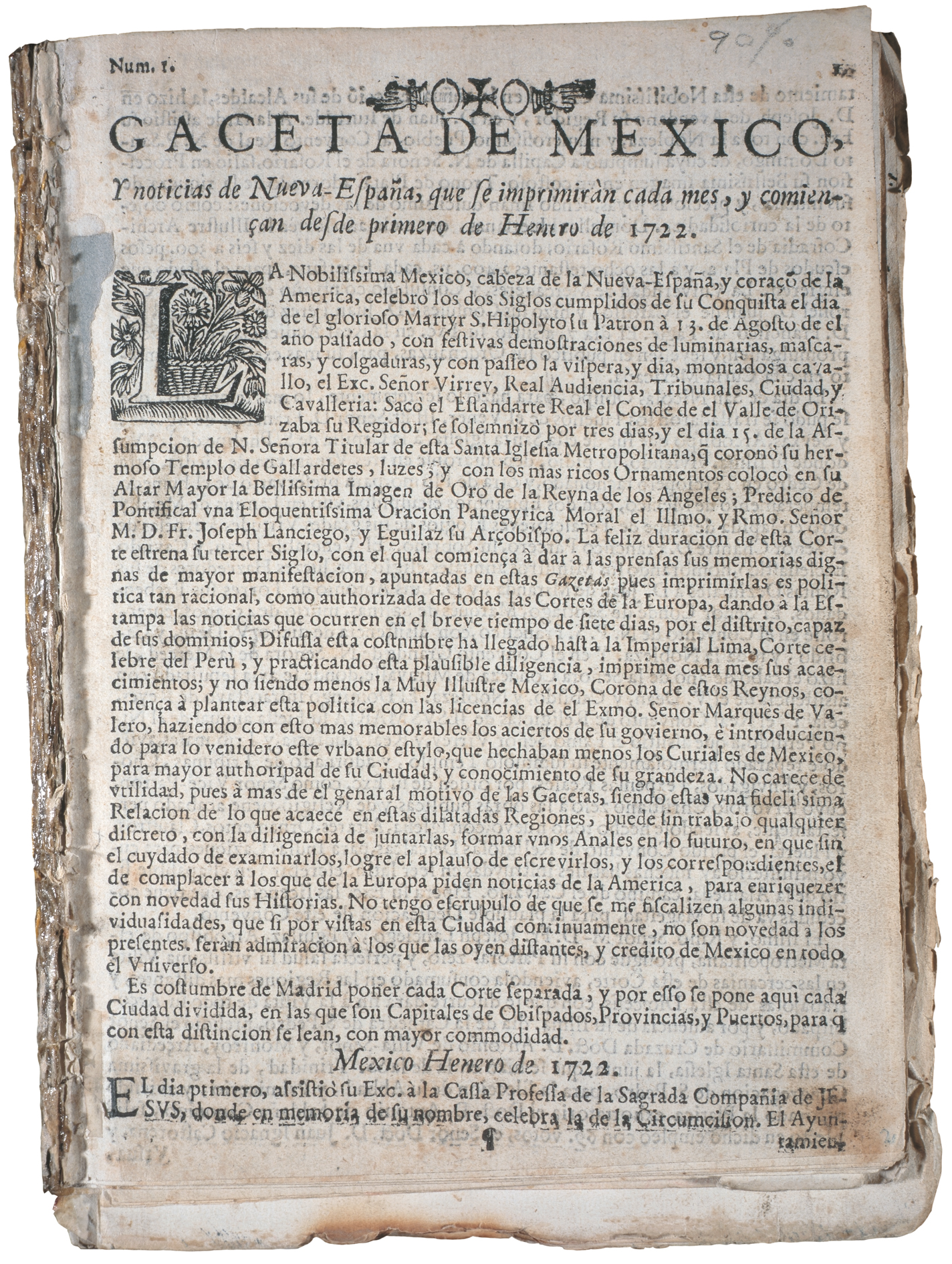
- First issue on January 1, 1722
- Founded: January 1, 1722.
- Language: Spanish
- Headquarters: Mexico City

La Gaceta de México was a Spanish language newspaper published in New Spain. It was first published in 1722 making it the first newspaper to be published in Hispanic America. It was founded by Juan Ignacio María de Castorena Ursúa y Goyeneche, a journalist, Catholic priest, and later Bishop of Yucatan. He was evidently a Jesuit, as he was educated under Jesuit direction in the Colegio Real de San Ildefonso, and the Seminario de la Sagrada Compañía de Jesús de la Corte de México, and had many Jesuit associates. He is considered the first journalist in Latin America for having created the periodical in Mexico City, whose first issue was published on January 1, 1722. He was a friend of Sor Juana Inés de la Cruz, editing some of her works and defending her right to cultivate writing literature.

== History of the Gaceta ==
In the eighteenth century a new form of periodical publication appeared: the gazette. Its objective was to provide information about Europe, the viceroyalty, arrival and departure of fleets and the publication of banns. The main gazettes were El Mercurio Volante, published by José Ignacio Bartolache, Diario Literario de México (Literary Journal of Mexico), Gaceta de Literatura de México and Asuntos Varios sobre ciencias y artes (Various Matters on Science and Arts), by José Antonio de Alzate y Ramírez.

The Gazeta de México y noticias de Nueva España - used the "z" in its spelling in respect for the Italian spelling, since Gaceta is a word that derives from that language. The publication consisted of eight pages per issue, and six numbers appeared under that name, until June 1722. From the fourth issue it was called Gazeta de México y florilegio historial de las noticias de Nueva España. Originally, the publication was conceived to record the events that occurred in the viceregal court. The objective of its editor was to report on the most notable and praiseworthy events of the day, in order to provide this information to the public. It was framed within the cultural and educational aims of the Bourbon dynasty, that is, it was intended to spread European ideas and customs among readers.

The Gaceta de México was the first newspaper published in Hispanic America. In the North American continent Publick Occurrences preceded it, with its only issue published September 25, 1690, in Boston. Later, in the Spanish America, other newspapers were begun, all following the example of the Gaceta de Madrid. They included the Gazeta de Guatemala (1729), the Gazeta de Lima (1743) ), the Gazeta de la Habana (1764), the Gaceta de Santa Fe de Bogotá (1785), and the Primicias de la cultura de Quito (1792).

New Spain's first Gaceta de México publication suspended publication six months after its first issue. However, a few years later another newspaper with the same name emerged, which began its publication on January 1, 1728. This consisted of four pages per issue, and its editor was Juan Francisco Sahagún y Arévalo Ladrón de Guevara. It lasted until December 1739, publishing a total of 145 issues.

There was a third Gaceta de México, a compendium of news from New Spain, which emerged on January 14, 1784, and suspended publication on January 2, 1810. It was edited by the Creole Manuel Antonio Valdés y Munguía, a printer and the owner of a company of rental coaches. This third version of the Gazette was the longest running newspaper in the Mexican viceregal era.
