= HMS Tickler (1798) =

Sloop of the Royal Navy

HMS Tickler was a gunvessel purchased in Honduras for local use. She was a sloop armed with one 18-pounder gun and had a crew of 25 men. Like Towzer, she was under the command of a merchant captain, in Tickler's case a Mr. Hosmer, who brought with him some of his crew.

She served in defense of the British colonists at Honduras and participated in the repulse of the Spanish expedition at the Battle of St. George's Caye in September 1798. She was still listed in 1800 and her ultimate disposition is unknown.

It is arguable that she deserves the designation "HMS" as Tickler was never commissioned into the Royal Navy, and her officers and crew were civilians. Even in the case of hired armed vessels, where the Navy provided the captain, the vessel was at best described as "His Majesty's hired armed vessel".
