= Capture of Cayo Cocina =

1779 battle

Coordinates: 17°33′11″N 88°4′26″W

The Capture of Cayo Cocina (also known as Saint George's Caye) was the result of a Spanish military operation on the 15 September 1779 against a British settlement on Saint George's Caye, just off the coast of present-day Belize, during the Anglo-Spanish War. The settlement was at the time the major British population center in the area, until Spanish forces from the Captaincy General of Guatemala attacked it.

The Spaniards removed the entire population (140 Baymen along with 250 of their slaves), forced them to march overland from Bacalar to Mérida, and then transported them by sea to Havana. Settlers who had been working on the mainland eventually made their way to other nearby British settlements at Roatán or Black River. In 1782 the Spaniards released the prisoners and sent them to Jamaica. The entire Belizean territory was abandoned until 1784, after British logging rights were confirmed in the 1783 Treaty of Paris.
