= Domínguez's expedition to Honduras =

1831-1832 Spanish military expedition

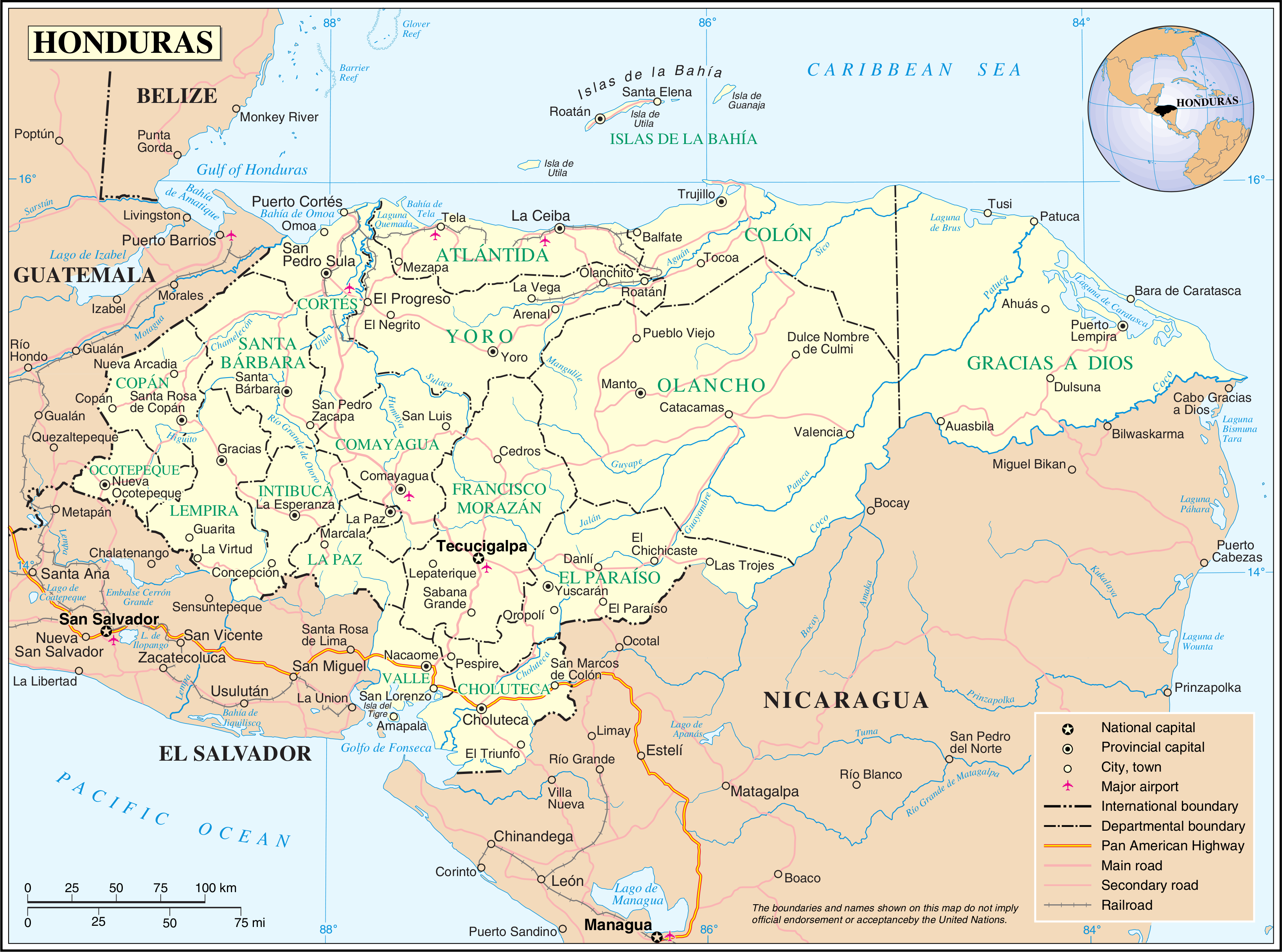
Date	1831–1832
Location	Honduras
Result	Honduran victory: Honduran independence is preserved

Combatants
Honduras	Conservative rebels

Commanders and leaders
(Honduras) Francisco Morazán (Honduras) Juan Galindo (Honduras) José Trinidad Cabañas (El Salvador) Francisco Malespín	(Mexico) Vicente Domínguez (executed) (El Salvador) Manuel José Arce

Strength
(Honduras) 1,500	Unknown

Casualties and losses
(Honduras) 300	Unknown

Domínguez's expedition to Honduras was an unsuccessful military expedition carried by the Mexican general, Vicente Domínguez in an attempt to re-establish Spanish control on Honduras.

== Background ==
Vicente Domínguez, a Mexican Colonel was expelled from Central America for opposing Honduras' leader Francisco Morazán, he returned in 1831. Seizing the northern coast, he joined a conservative federalist plan led by Manuel José Arce to invade Honduras from three fronts. Supported by Spain, the plan aimed to disable ports and capture Comayagua, with El Salvador providing additional troops.

== Conflict ==
=== Overview ===
In November of 1831, Colonel Ramón Guzmán surprised the Fortaleza de San Fernando de Omoa with 200 men, raising the Spanish flag. Colonel Vicente Domínguez seized Fortaleza de Santa Bárbara, executing the French captain Richard Duplessis. Domínguez sought support for a return to Spanish monarchy, loading the ship "Fénix" with arms for a revolution in Cuba. Alleged supporters included traders and priests. Meanwhile, General Francisco Morazán defended the Central American Federal Territory against Mexican intervention. Morazán's troops, led by Colonel Nícolas Raoul and Mexican Colonel José Martínez, defeated forces supporting Manuel José Arce on February 24, 1832. Simultaneously, in El Salvador, Morazán, with Colonels Narciso Benítez and Ramón Valladares, engaged in battles against Salvadoran forces, ultimately capturing San Salvador on March 28 and calling for elections.

The rebels managed to get in Honduras territory. Colonel José Antonio Márquez led government forces against rebels. The decisive Jaitique clash marked a turning point, resulting in Márquez's death. Subsequently, Colonel Guzmán's rebellion crumbled with the fall of Omoa after a six-month siege. Despite efforts by Vicente Domínguez, his defeat and capture occurred in May 1832. The battles encompassed confrontations in Trujillo, Tercales, and the significant engagement at Jaitique, leading to the ultimate surrender of Omoa and the capture of key rebel leaders.

During the 6-month siege of San Fernando de Omoa, an estimated 1,000 casualties occurred. Colonel Vicente Domínguez was executed on September 14, 1832. Caribbeans supporting conservatives faced persecution, with some fleeing to British Honduras (Belize). Honduras incurred debts for the campaign, and the government took measures post-war, including creating health boards and addressing military service regulations.

=== Development of the Restorative Plan and Federal–Honduran Counteroffensive ===
Colonel Ramón Guzmán launched a surprise attack with 200 men (Black and Carib troops) against the Fortress of San Fernando de Omoa on 11 November 1831. This important stronghold represented a major advance within the "Restorative Plan", and Guzmán took advantage of the limited military presence stationed there. He then raised the flag of Spain atop the fortress.

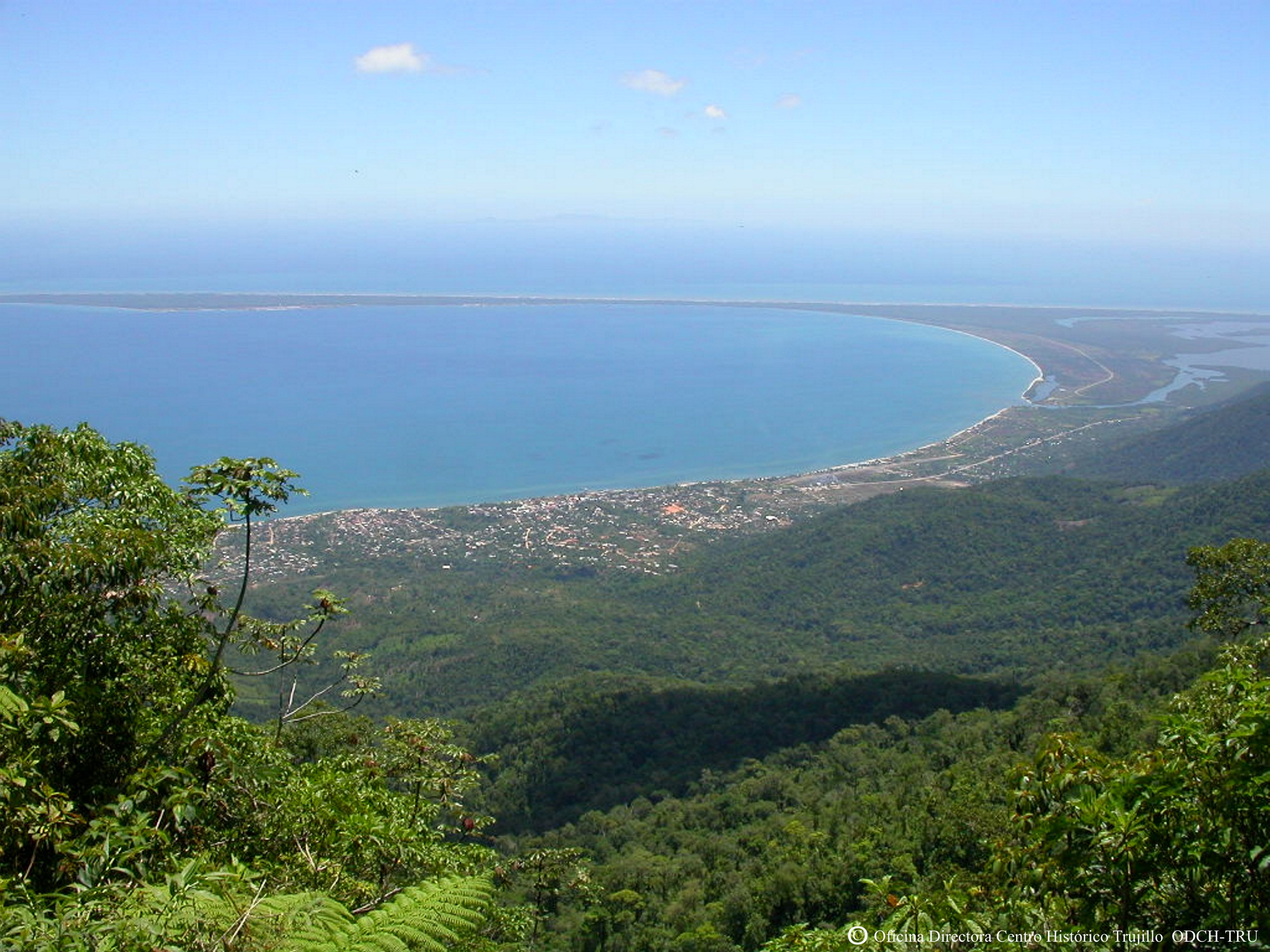
View of the Bay of Trujillo.

==== Battle of Trujillo ====
This took place when the Head of State of Honduras, Colonel José Antonio Márquez, an officer of the Honduran Army, ordered Lieutenant Colonel Francisco Ferrera to march to restore control of the port of Trujillo.

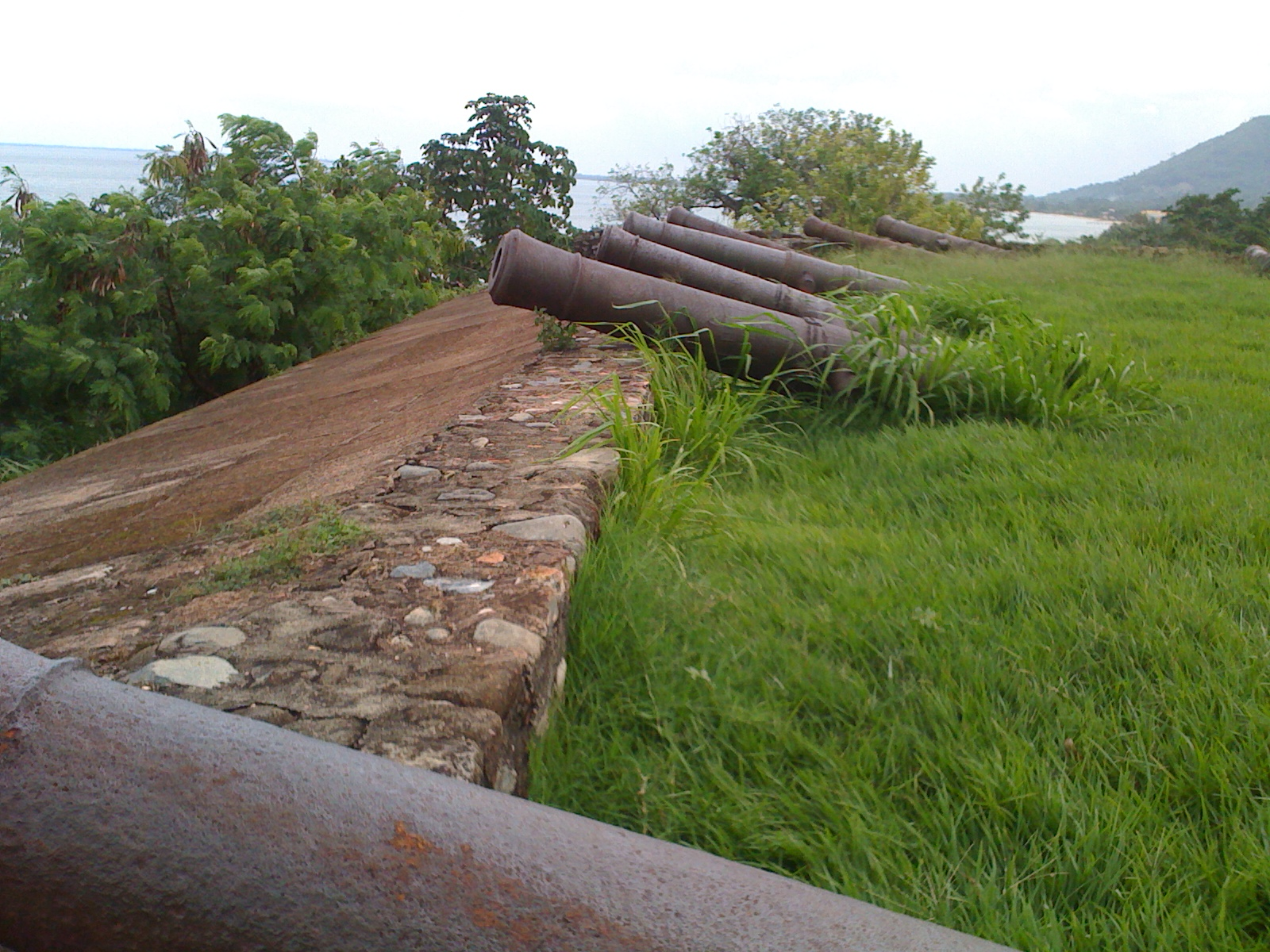
The Fortress of Santa Bárbara in Trujillo, built in 1550; this view shows artillery used to defend the bay from Caribbean attacks.

==== Battle of Tercales ====
Unable to travel to Cuba, Colonel Vicente Domínguez was forced to remain on land. On 7 March 1832, he departed from Trujillo with his personal troops toward Yoro, evading Honduran forces. However, on 9 March in the locality of Tercales, he confronted the cavalry of the Honduran Army, commanded by the "Iron Mulatto", Lieutenant Colonel Francisco Ferrera.

==== Battle of Jaitique ====
On 22 March 1832, the Head of State of Honduras, Colonel José Antonio Márquez, left the administration in the hands of José Francisco Milla Guevara in order to defend national territory and departed from the capital, Comayagua, at the head of allied troops. On 25 March 1832, Márquez (suffering from fever) confronted Colonel Vicente Domínguez and died on the eve of the decisive Battle of Jaitique, which took place on 26 March. Without delay, Colonel José María Gutiérrez Osejo, commanding his column known as the "Invincible", composed of 200 men and supported by Colonel José Trinidad Cabañas Fiallos, engaged the 600 men commanded by Colonels Vicente Domínguez and Pedro González. After four hours of combat, the victory of the Honduran forces became evident as the rebels retreated.

==== Siege and Battle of San Fernando de Omoa ====
Colonel Henry Torrelonge, a prominent Morazanist officer and commander of the Allied Army Protector of the Law, marched toward Omoa to confront the rebel leader Colonel Ramón Guzmán. One of these engagements took place at the site known as "La Barranca" on 28 April 1832 near the port.

Due to its proximity to both the fortress and the Caribbean Sea, the detachment under Ramón Guzmán withstood attacks from the Unionist Army—mostly coming by land—thanks to supplies delivered by the schooner Ejecutivo. However, when vessels supporting Honduras appeared, including the schooner Deseada, the rebel schooner was captured and its Spanish captain, Miguel Arrechea, was taken prisoner. The rebels inside the fortress found themselves surrounded.

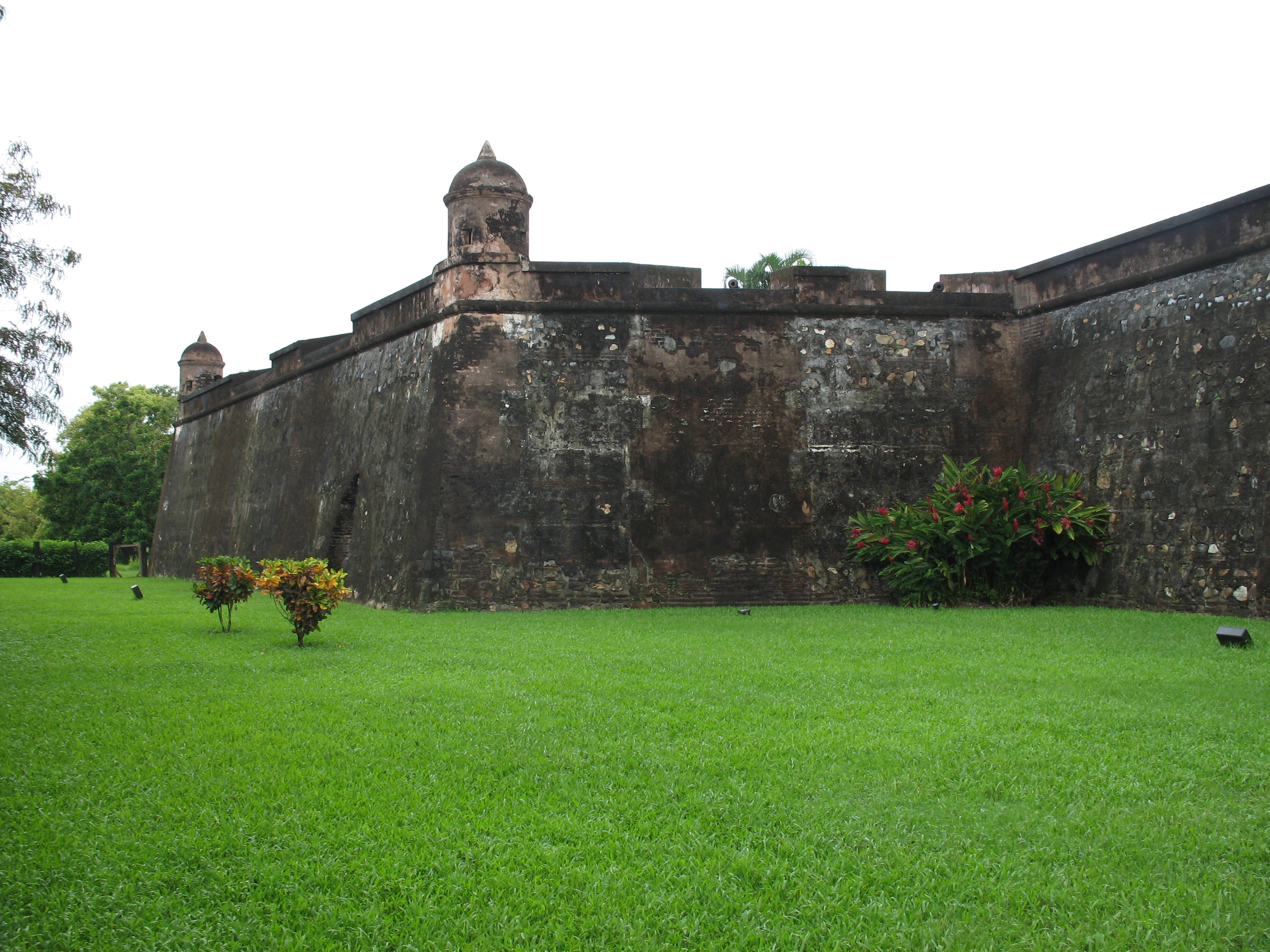
Fortress of San Fernando de Omoa, built in 1759.

The surrender of the fortress occurred after six months of resistance. The garrison could no longer withstand the siege and surrendered to Colonel Agustín Guzmán, an officer of the Federal Army, handing over the leader Ramón Guzmán, who was immediately arrested and charged with crimes related to the insurrection. The following day, Ramón Guzmán and Antonio Fernández were executed by firing squad within the fortress.

In September 1832, the Boletín Extraordinario of Central America reported the number of troops that besieged the fortress:

Allied forces	Soldiers
Artillery	21
Federal Battalion	190
Federal Cavalry	51
Militias of Zacapa, Gualán, and Chiquimula	339
Permanent Battalion of Guatemala	209
Verapaz, Guatemala	78
Texiguat, Honduras	34
Yoro, Honduras	53
Trujillo, Honduras	142
Militia company of El Salvador	97
Total	1,214

==== Battle of Opoteca ====
On 5 May 1832, Vicente Domínguez found that his lieutenant Pedro González and other officers had abandoned him. The Honduran army was at the gates of the locality, and the final battle took place: Domínguez was defeated and taken prisoner. In a note, Colonel Vicente Domínguez requested clemency from the Honduran government for the people of Opoteca who had supported his military campaign.
