= Santa Bárbara fortress =

Coordinates: 15.9209°N 85.9524°W

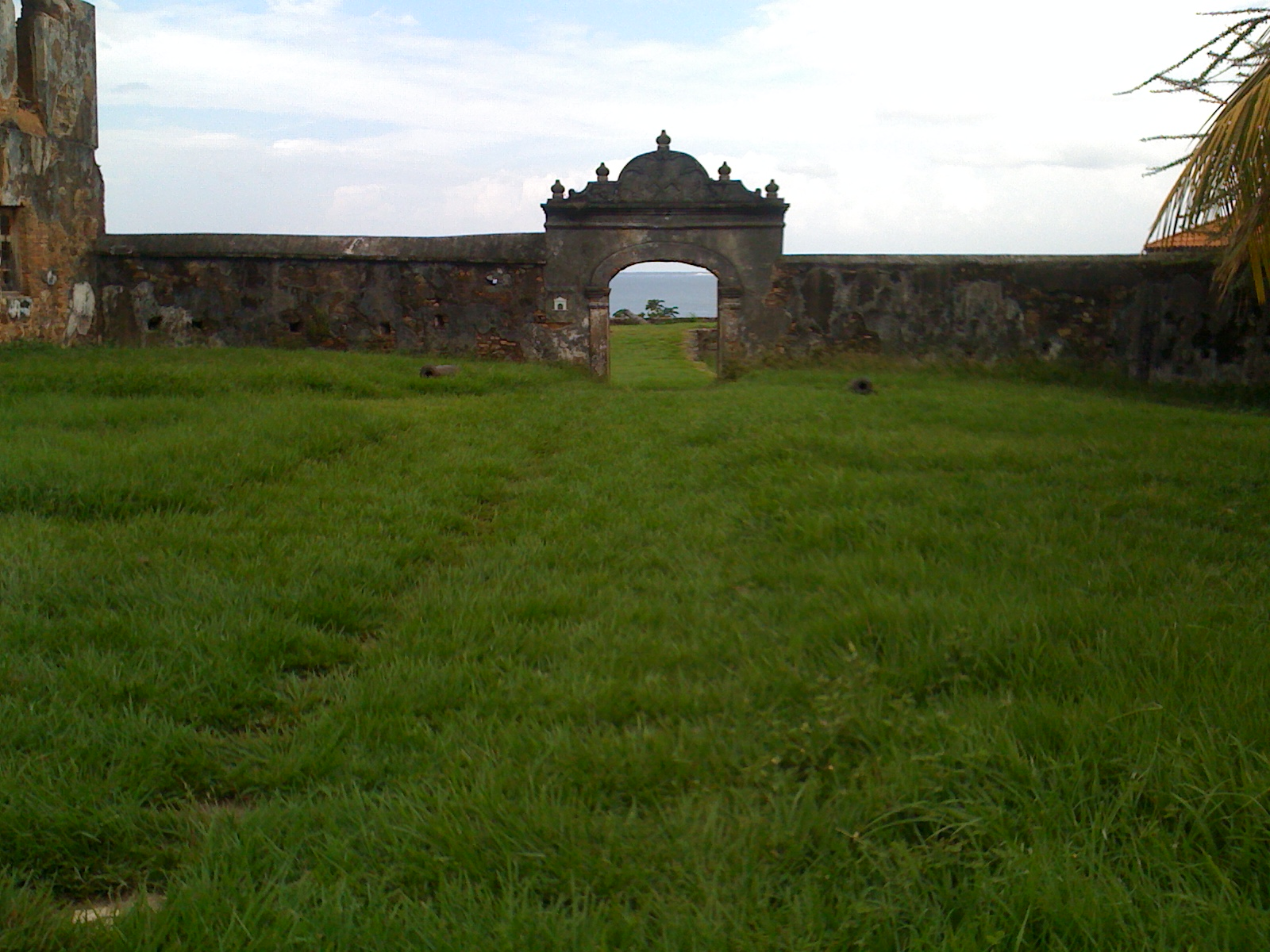
Main gate.

The Fortress of Santa Bárbara, also known as El Castillo, is located in the city of Trujillo in the department of Colón, Honduras. The fortress is the oldest European building built for military purposes by Spanish settlers in american mainland. This fort is declared a National Historic Monument and Heritage of the Republic of Honduras, through Government Agreement No. 049, dated March 8, 1990, the building became the property and care of the IHAH (Honduran institute of History and anthropology) in 1997.

== History ==
The Genoese navigator Christopher Columbus landed on August 14, 1502 on his fourth voyage and called the place Punta de Caxinas. Later, Don Hernán Cortés, when he visited the Honduran coasts, ordered the foundation of a base on that site to defend it, entrusting the task to Captain Cristóbal de Olid, who, apart from creating the barracks, renamed the place "Villa del triunfo de la cruz".

In 1550, it is known that the Spanish built with indigenous labor a defensive post for the coasts and the port; They called the fortress "Santa Bárbara" in honor of the artillery patron virgin, and it is located on a hill from which the bay can be seen. At least 200 Spaniards lived in Trujillo by the time it was being built. By 1575, the Captaincy General of Guatemala ordered the transfer and placement of four cannons in a defensive point on the coast. Later, in 1629, it is known that the fortress had six artillery cannons, to defend the town from pirates and corsairs in the Caribbean Sea.

=== Description ===
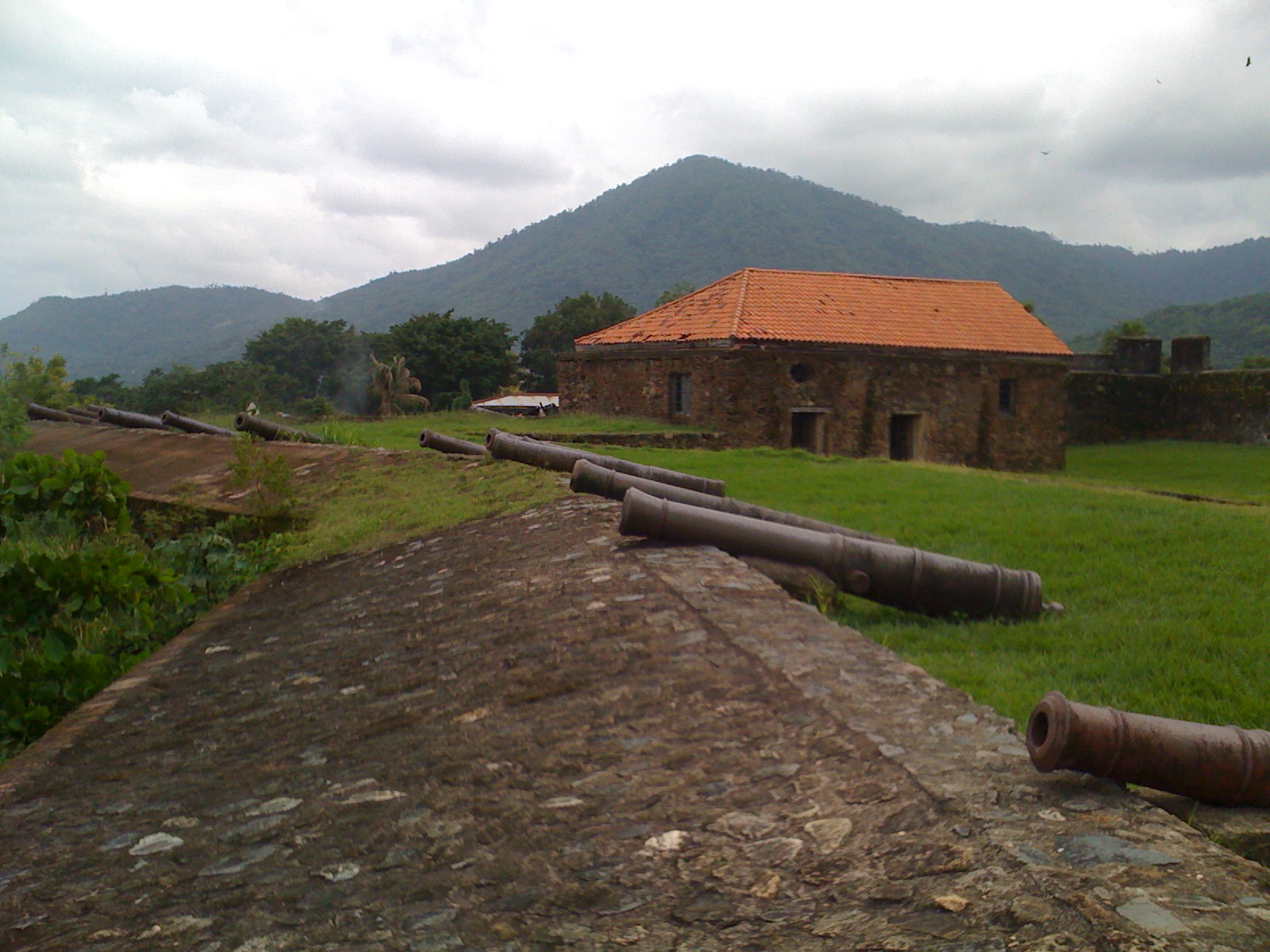
The fortress has 14 cannons from Spain, and served Honduras for more than 300 years.

The fortress has fourteen cannons brought from Spain and was in service for three hundred years. The fortress of Santa Bárbara is built on a hill in Trujillo, from which the port, the bay and the Caribbean Sea can be perfectly seen. The first defensive row are the remains of some walls in which even the artillery cannons are placed in the direction of the bay, then there are higher walls and flanking towers that served as protection for the Spanish soldiers, the command headquarters is in the center.

=== William Walker grave ===
In the fortress several battles were fought between pirates and settlers, in 1860 he witnessed the new intrusion of the filibuster William Walker to the Central American coasts, where he was finally defeated and captured, being executed by shooting on September 12, 1860. His tombstone of Marble, where it is said that the remains of this character rest, is in the vicinity of this small fort, which is a tourist attraction.

Restoration works

The Honduran government ordered a review of the building, report and subsequent restoration that was under the direction of Dr. Kathy Deagan of the National Autonomous University of Honduras.

=== Museum ===
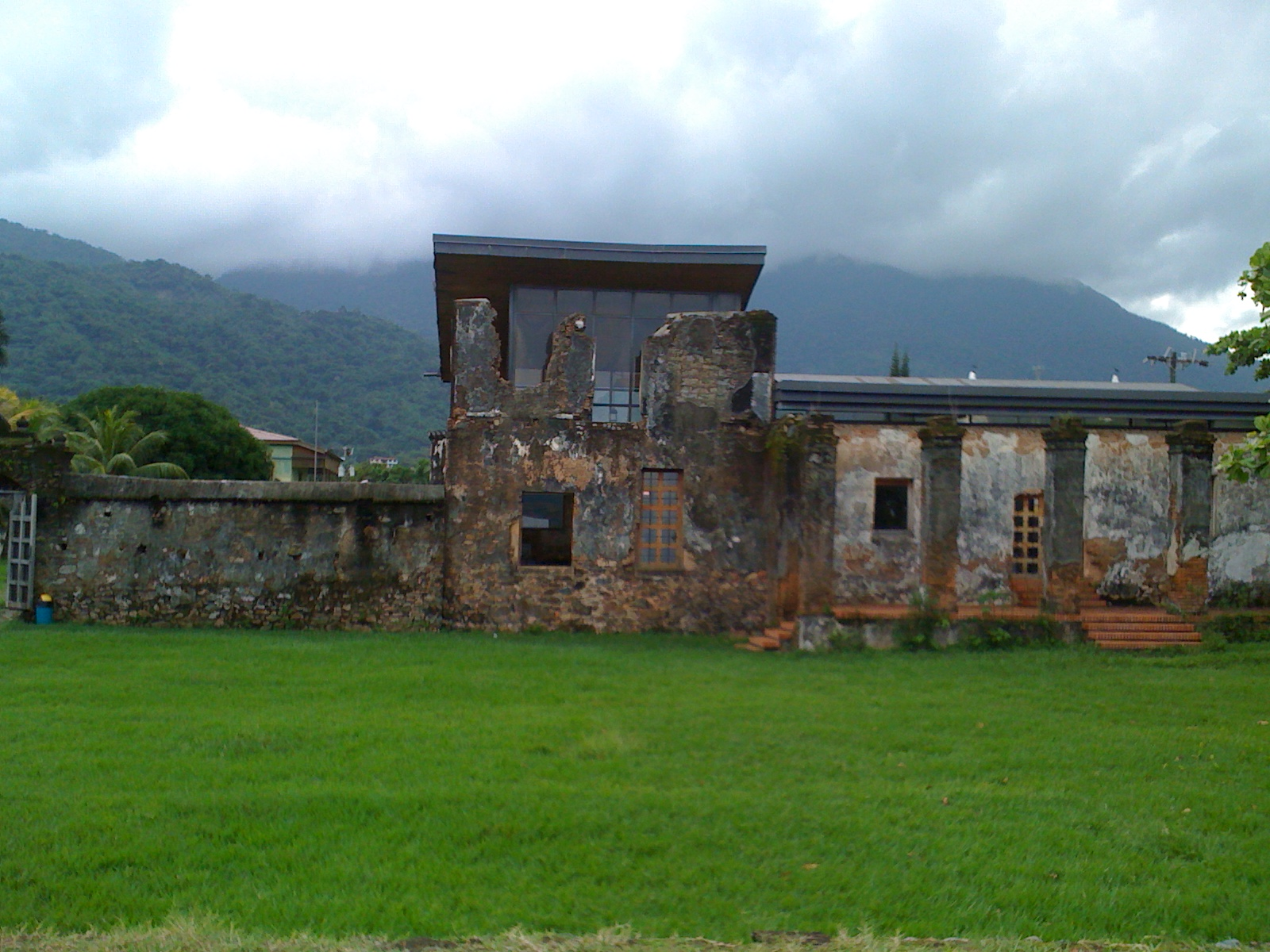
Fortress museum

The Museum of the Fortress of Santa Bárbara contains a collection of pre-Hispanic objects found in the area, has an exhibition of objects from the colonial and republican period, tangible and intangible multicultural heritage due to the existing cultural diversity, it also has collections from the pre-Hispanic era, colonial and republican. This exhibition aims to promote among the inhabitants of the region and its visitors, the Cultural Heritage of which they are depositories, with the hope that each national or foreign person, of any age or religious creed, will become the guardian who ensures their protection for knowledge and benefit for themselves and for future generations.

== See also ==
- History of Honduras
- Fortaleza de San Fernando
- San Cristobal Fortress
