= San Cristóbal fortress (Honduras) =

Coordinates: 14.5886°N 88.5845°W

Fuerte de San Cristóbal
- Honduras
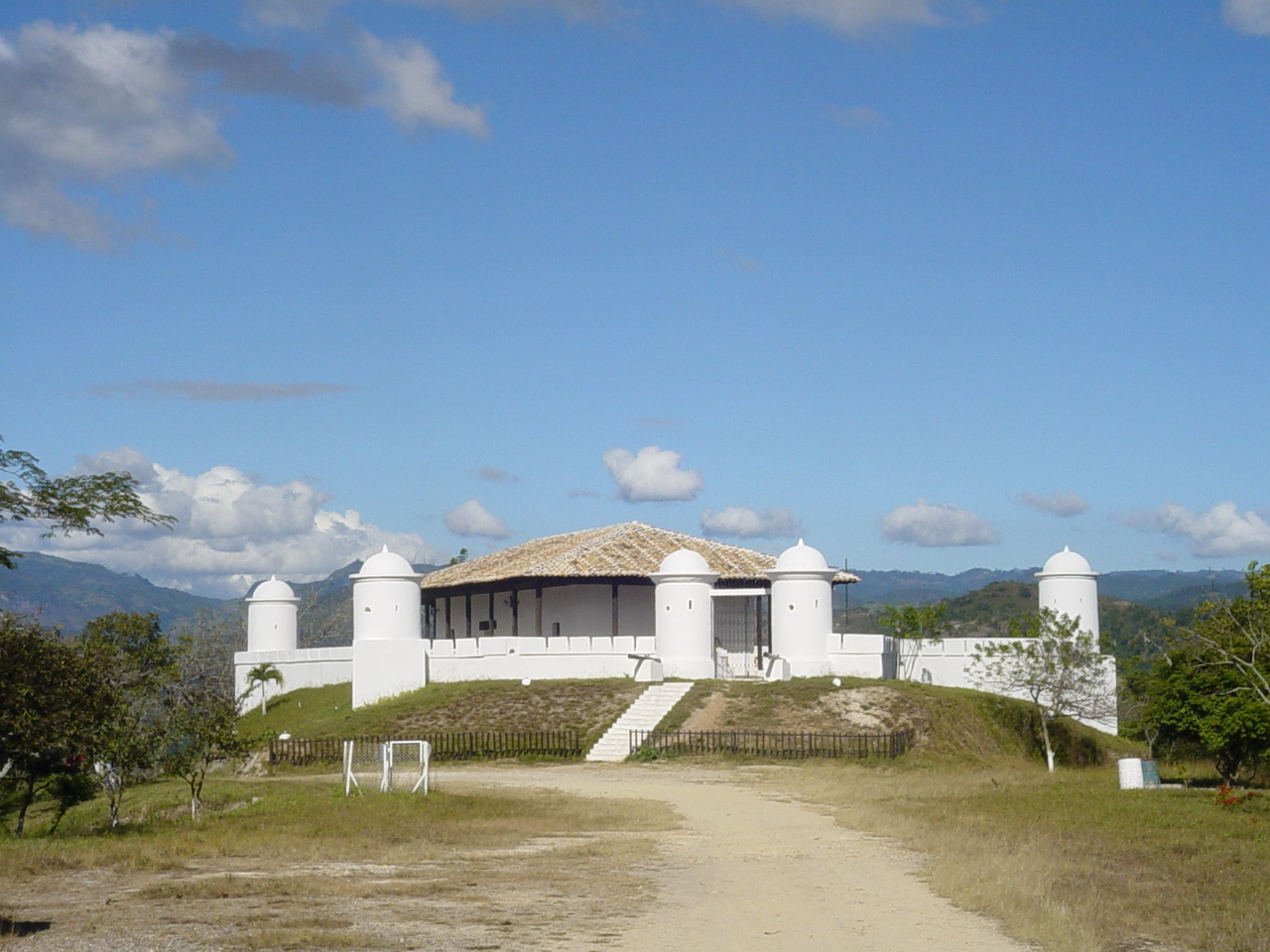

Site information
- Open to the public: Yes
- Status: Preserved

Site history
- Built: 1863–1876
- Materials: Mudbricks and Rocks.

The San Cristóbal fortress is located in the city of Gracias, department of Lempira, built on a small hill above the city, which was formerly the center of the town of Gracias Lempira, which was once the capital of New Spain and headquarters of the Real Audiencia de los Confines in 1544; Gracias was a strategic city within the Province of Honduras in the colonial era, then in the pro-independence era and then in the Central American federal transition.

== History ==
=== Background ===
The first building of Spanish origin was built in the seventeenth century, on the hill "San Cristóbal", and of which two cannons with the emblem of Carlos IV of Spain are preserved.

In 1850 the fort was rebuilt by order of Juan Lindo, fearing an invasion from Guatemala. But it was not until 1863 that the works of the present fort began, which was concluded between 1875 and 1876, in the administration of Captain General José María Medina. Its purpose was to defend the city from its strategic point of invasion by enemy armies. From its walls painted in white were placed the firearms and cannons that defended the perimeter. It has several watchtowers, and in the center rests the command headquarters, powder magazine, hospital, etc.

During the second Honduran civil war of 1924, on February 7, the city of Gracias fell into the hands of rebel forces under the command of officers General Vicente Tosta Carrasco and General Gregorio Ferrera. In 1959 there was a rebellion between the commanders of the Third Military Zone of Honduras that included the departments of Copán, Lempira, Ocotepeque and Santa Bárbara. The headquarters was in the city of Santa Rosa de Copán, but rebel officers transferred it to Gracias and took Fort San Cristóbal as a defensive bastion.

=== Tourism ===
The 19th century monument is open to the national and foreign public, and in this rests the tomb of the president of Honduras, Juan Nepomuceno Fernández Lindo y Zelaya and whose commemorative plaque contains the following legend: "You can be a hated ruler of your time But if you want the vote of future generations to favor you, Open schools! Juan Lindo".

== Gallery ==
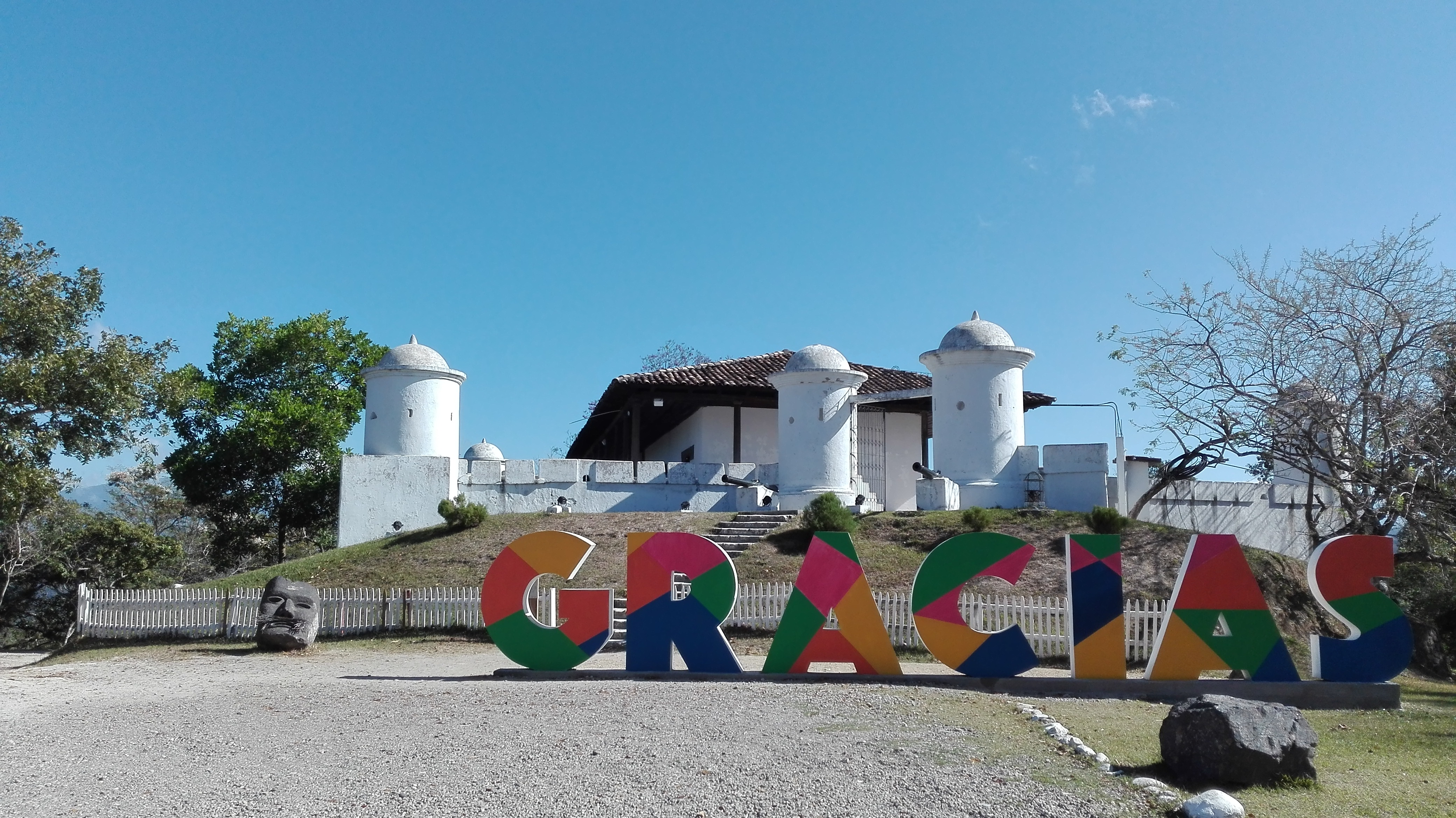
Frontal view from the outside structure.

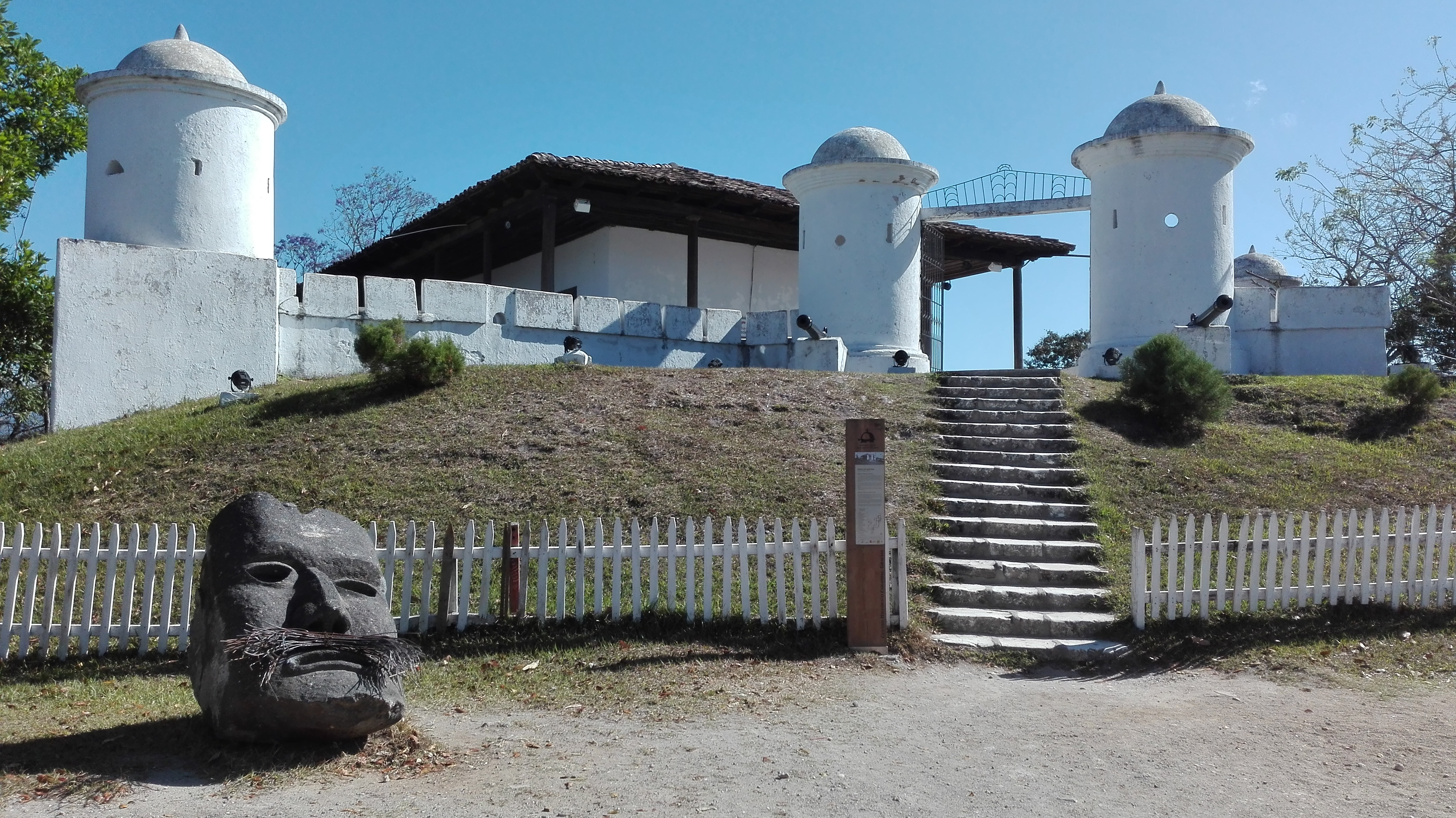
Main entrance.

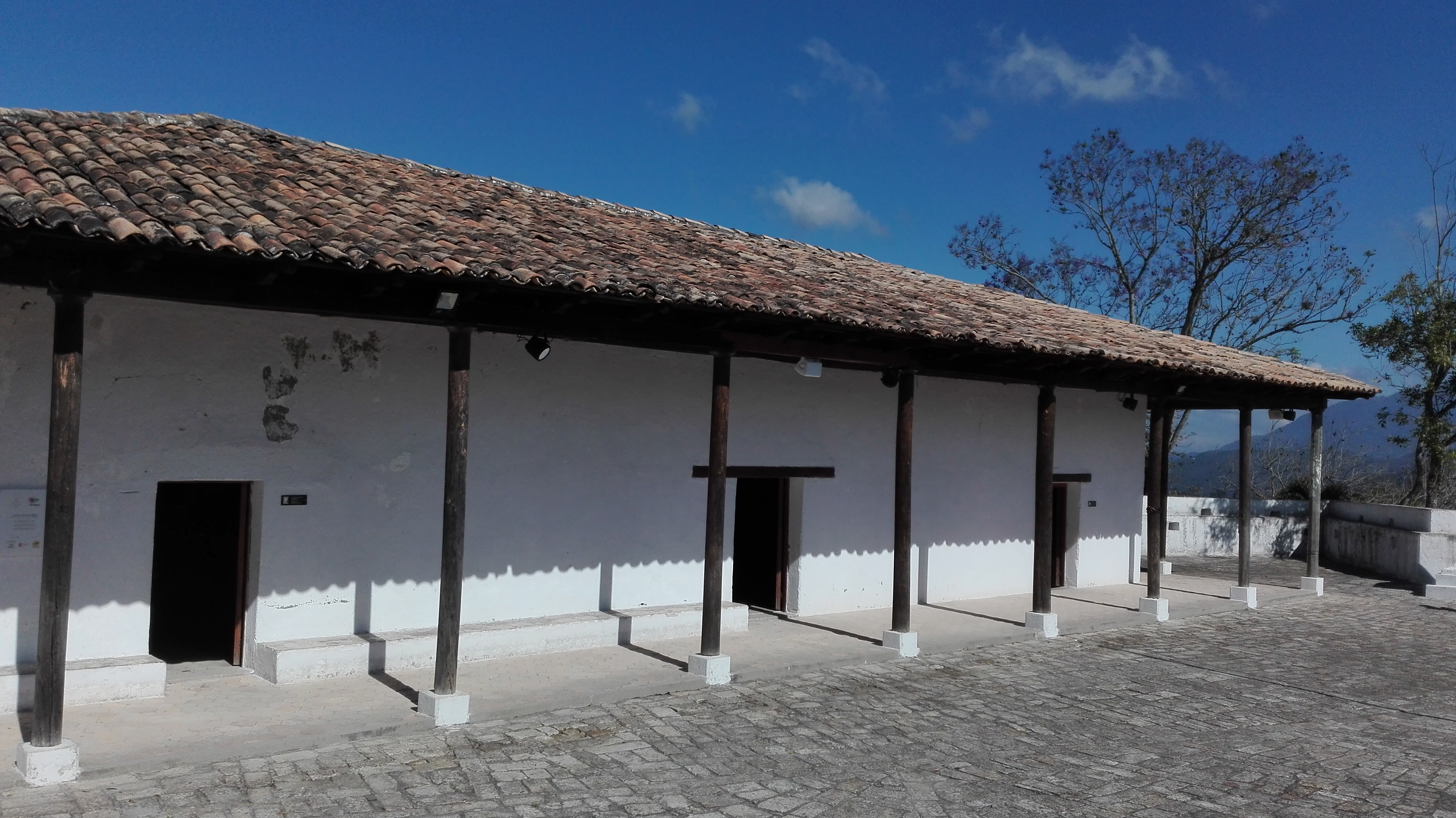
Frontal view of the main building.

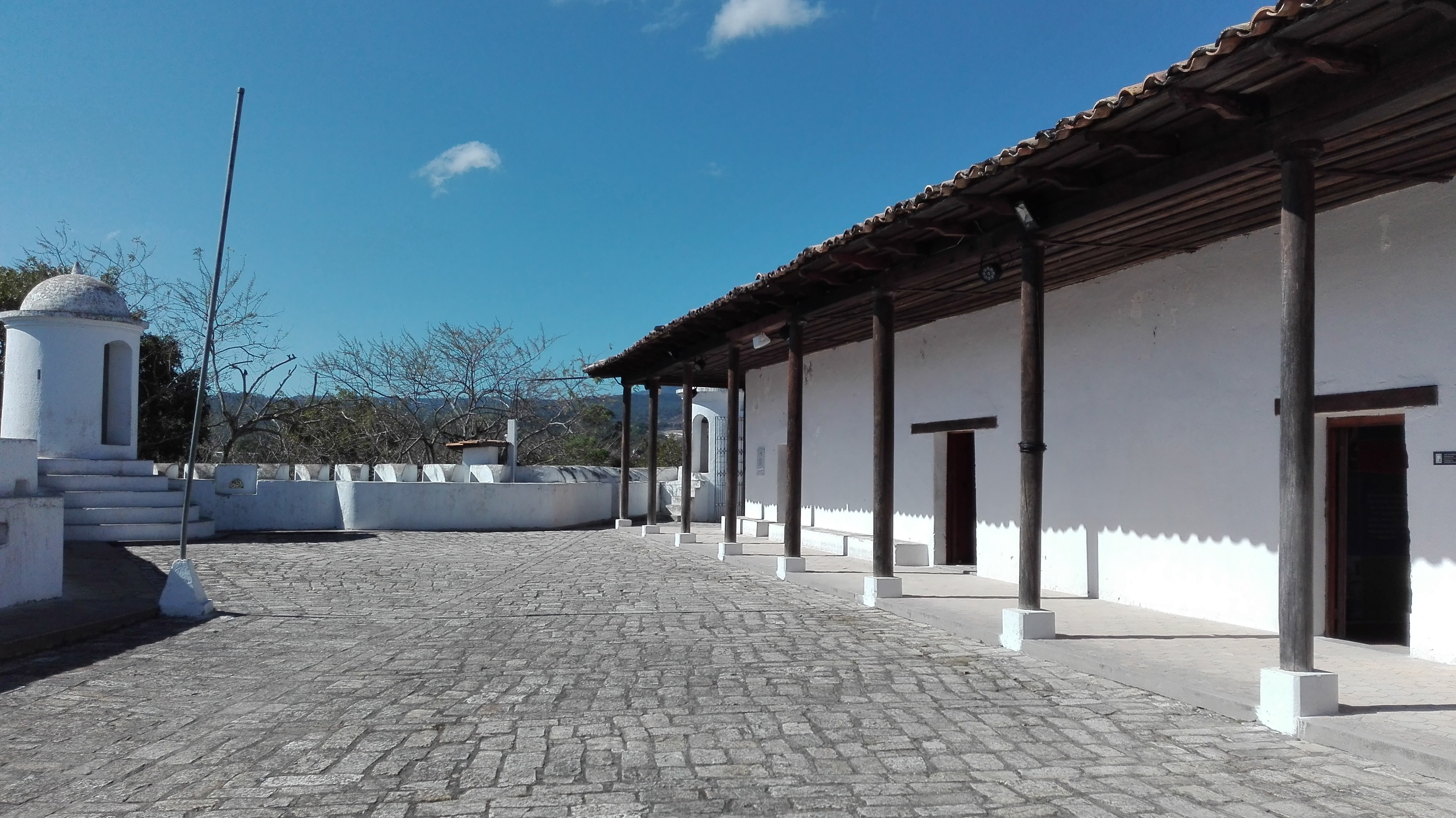
Left side section.

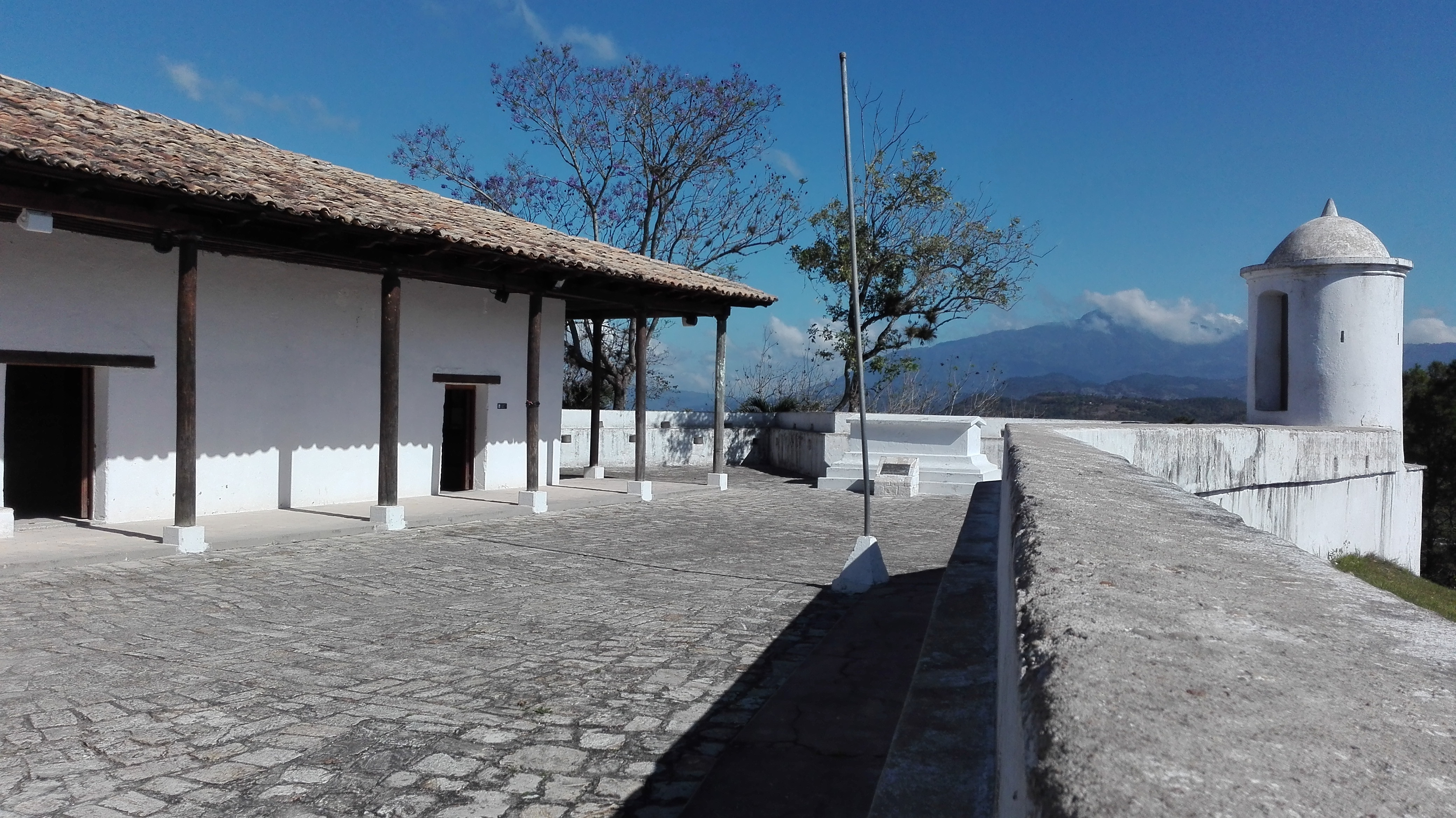
View of the right side section.

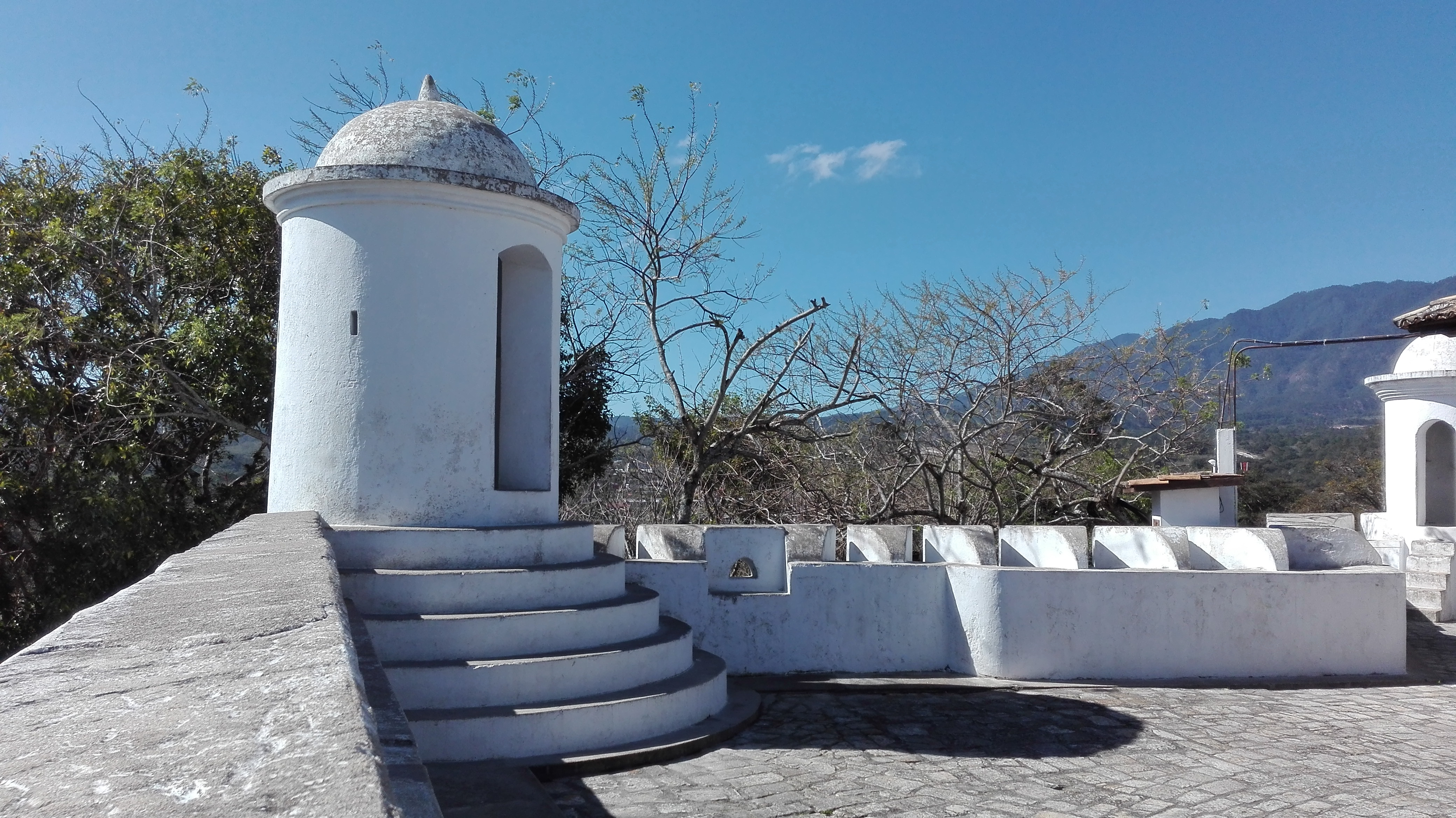
Vigilance Towers.

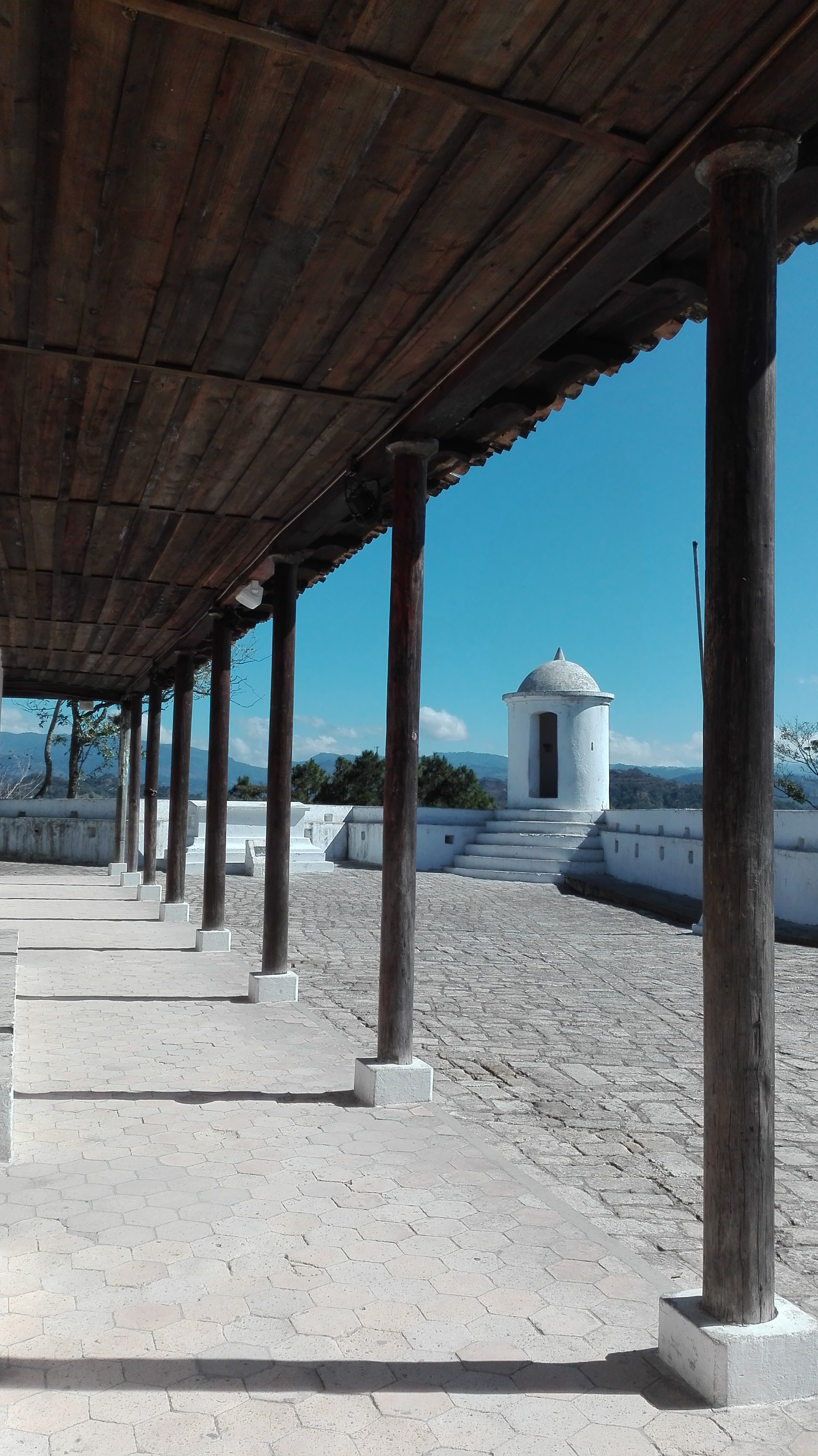
Corridor.

== See also ==
- History of Honduras
- Santa Bárbara Fortress
- Fortaleza de San Fernando
