= Trujillo, Honduras =

Trujillo
- Municipality
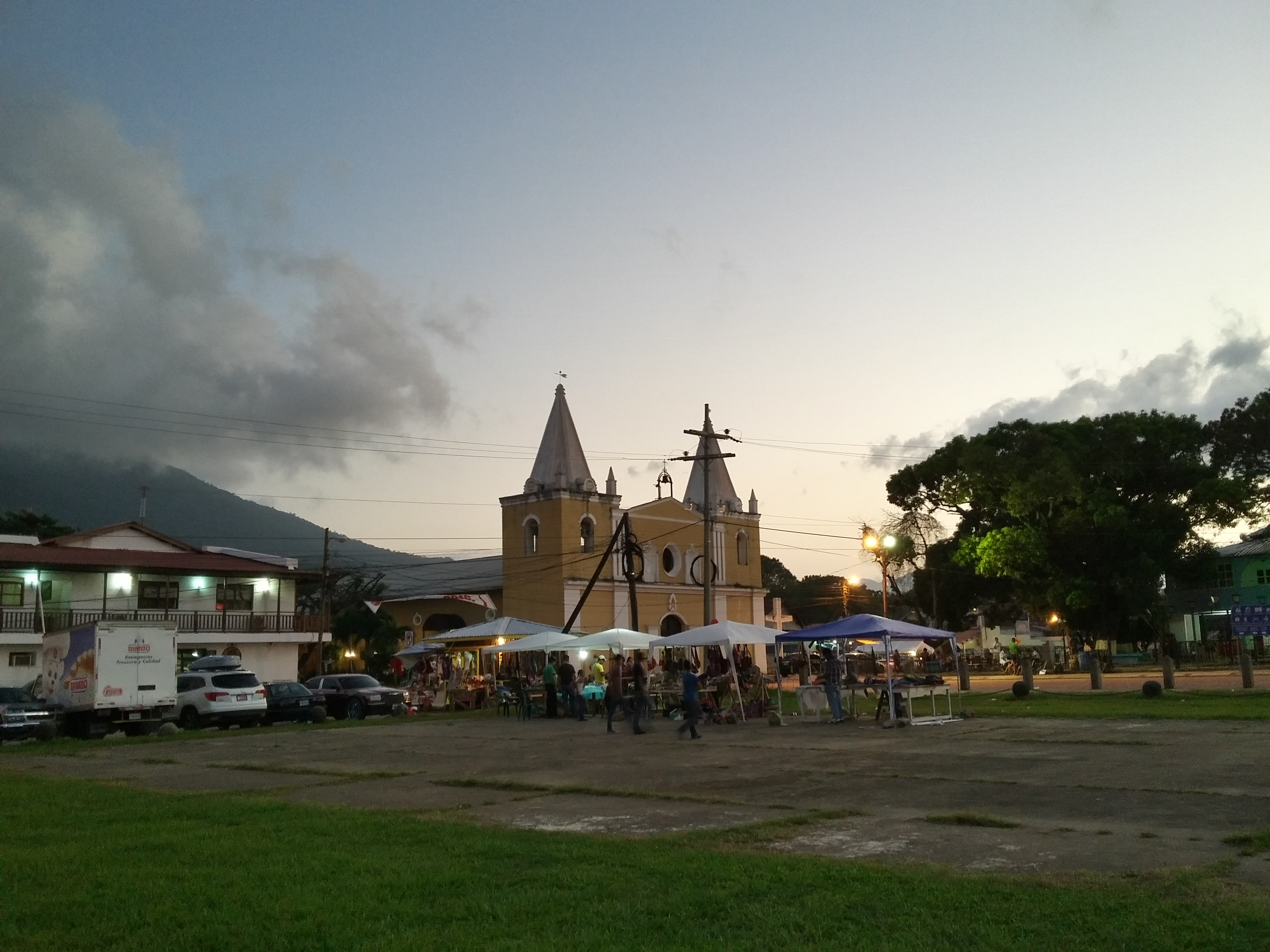
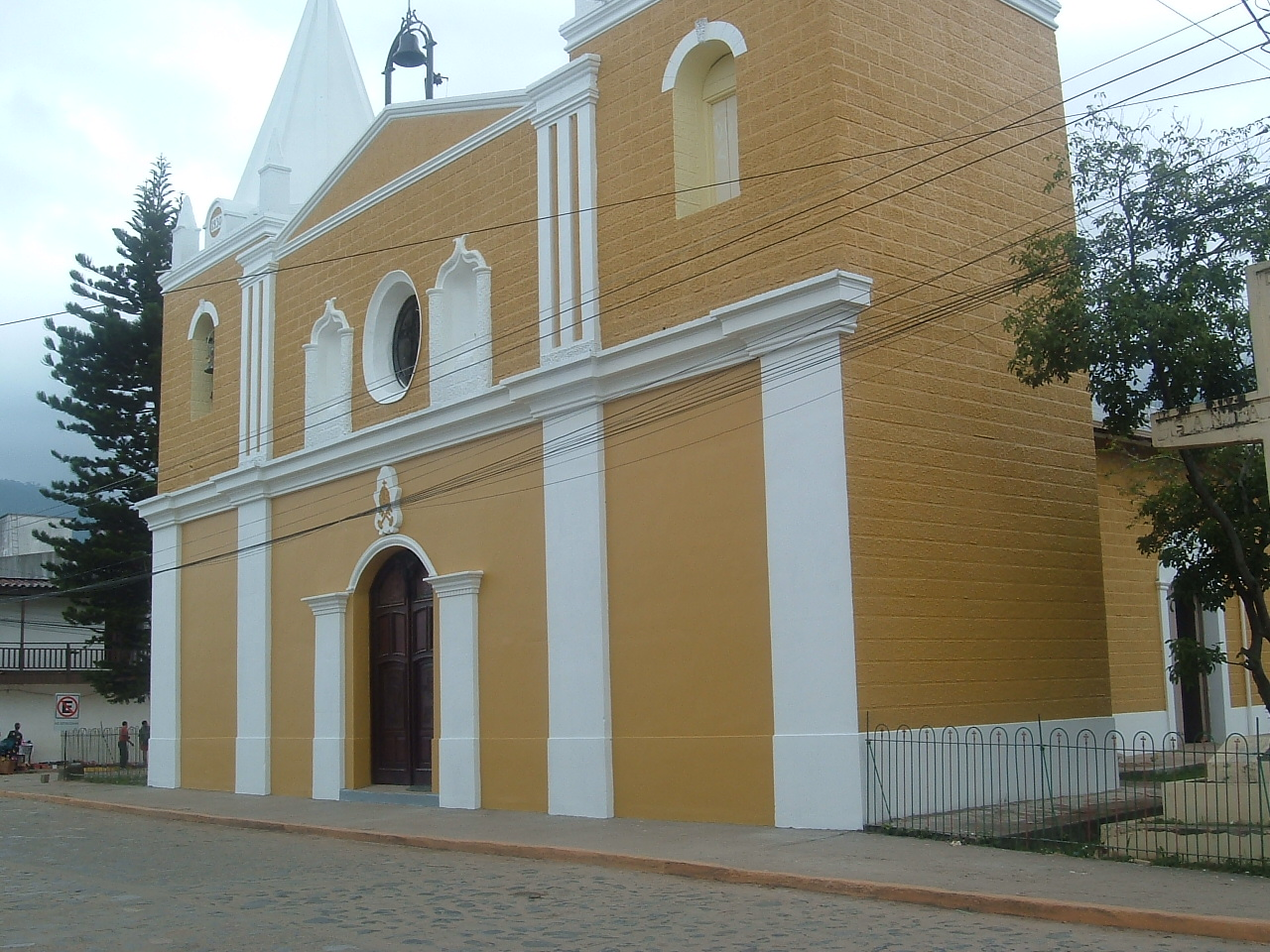
- Trujillo Cathedral Closer view

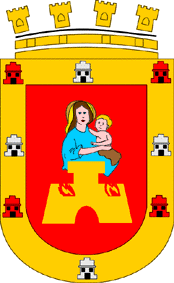
- Seal

- Location within Honduras
- Coordinates: 15°55′N 86°00′W
- Country: Honduras
- Department: Colón

Government
  - Mayor: Héctor Raúl Mendoza Galindo (Libre)

Area
  - Municipality: 955 km^{2} (369 sq mi)

Population (2023 projection)
  - Municipality: 71,106
  - Density: 74.5/km^{2} (193/sq mi)
  - Urban: 31,464
- Time zone: UTC−06:00 (CST)
- Postal code: 32101
- Administrative code: 0201

Trujillo is a city, with a population of 22,750 (2023 calculation), and a municipality on the northern Caribbean coast of the Honduran department of Colón, of which the city is the capital.

The municipality had a population of about 30,000 (2003). The city is located on a bluff overlooking the Bay of Trujillo. Behind the city rise two prominent mountains, Mount Capiro and Mount Calentura. Three Garifuna fishing villages—Santa Fe, San Antonio, and Guadelupe—are located along the beach.

Trujillo has received plenty of attention as the potential site of a proposed Honduran charter city project, according to an idea originally advocated by American economist Paul Romer. Often referred to as a Hong Kong in Honduras, and advocated by among others the Trujillo-born Honduran president Porfirio Lobo Sosa, the project has also been met with skepticism and controversy, especially due to its supposed disregard for the local Garifuna culture.

== History ==
Christopher Columbus landed in Trujillo on August 14, 1502, during his fourth and final voyage to the Americas. Columbus named the place "Punta de Caxinas". It was the first time he touched the Central American mainland. He noticed that the water in this part of the Caribbean was very deep and therefore called the area Golfo de Honduras, i.e., The Gulf of the Depths (see: Bay of Honduras).

=== Colonial period ===
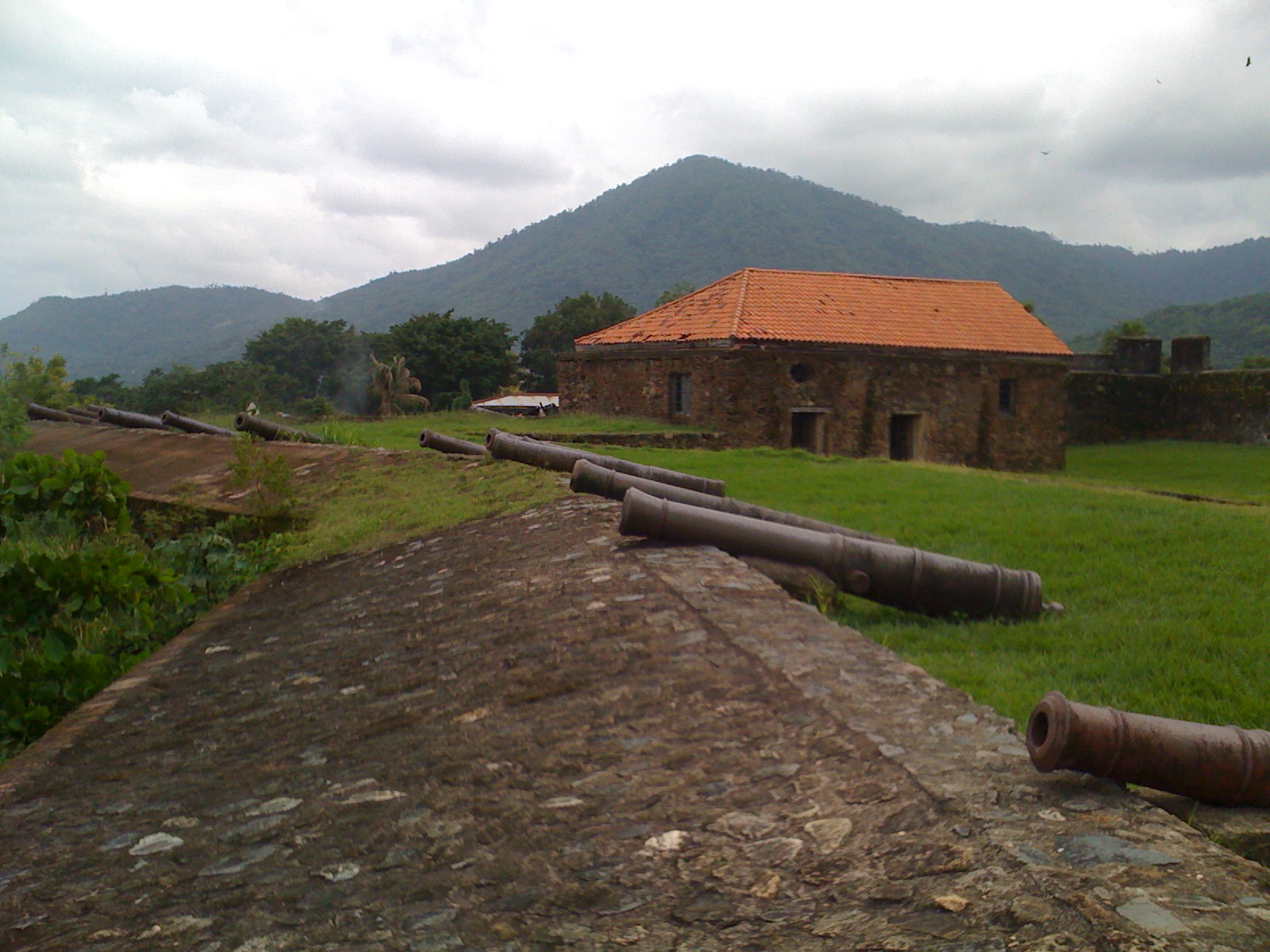
Santa Barbara fortress, built during the 16th century

The history of the modern town begins in 1524, shortly after the conquest of the Aztec Empire in an expedition led by Hernán Cortés. Cortés sent Cristóbal de Olid to found a Spanish outpost in the region, and he established a town named Triunfo de la Cruz in the vicinity. When Olid began using the town as his base for establishing his own realm in Central America, Cortés sent Francisco de las Casas to remove him. Las Casas lost most of his fleet in a storm, but he was nevertheless able to defeat Olid and restore the region to Cortés. Upon assuming control, Las Casas decided to relocate the town to its present location, because the natural harbor was larger. At the same time, Triunfo de la Cruz was renamed Trujillo. His deputy, Juan López de Aguirre was charged with establishing the new town, but he sailed off, leaving another deputy, named Medina, to found the town. In the coming years Trujillo became more important as a shipment point for gold and silver mined in the interior of the country. Because of its sparse population, the city also became a frequent target of pirates.

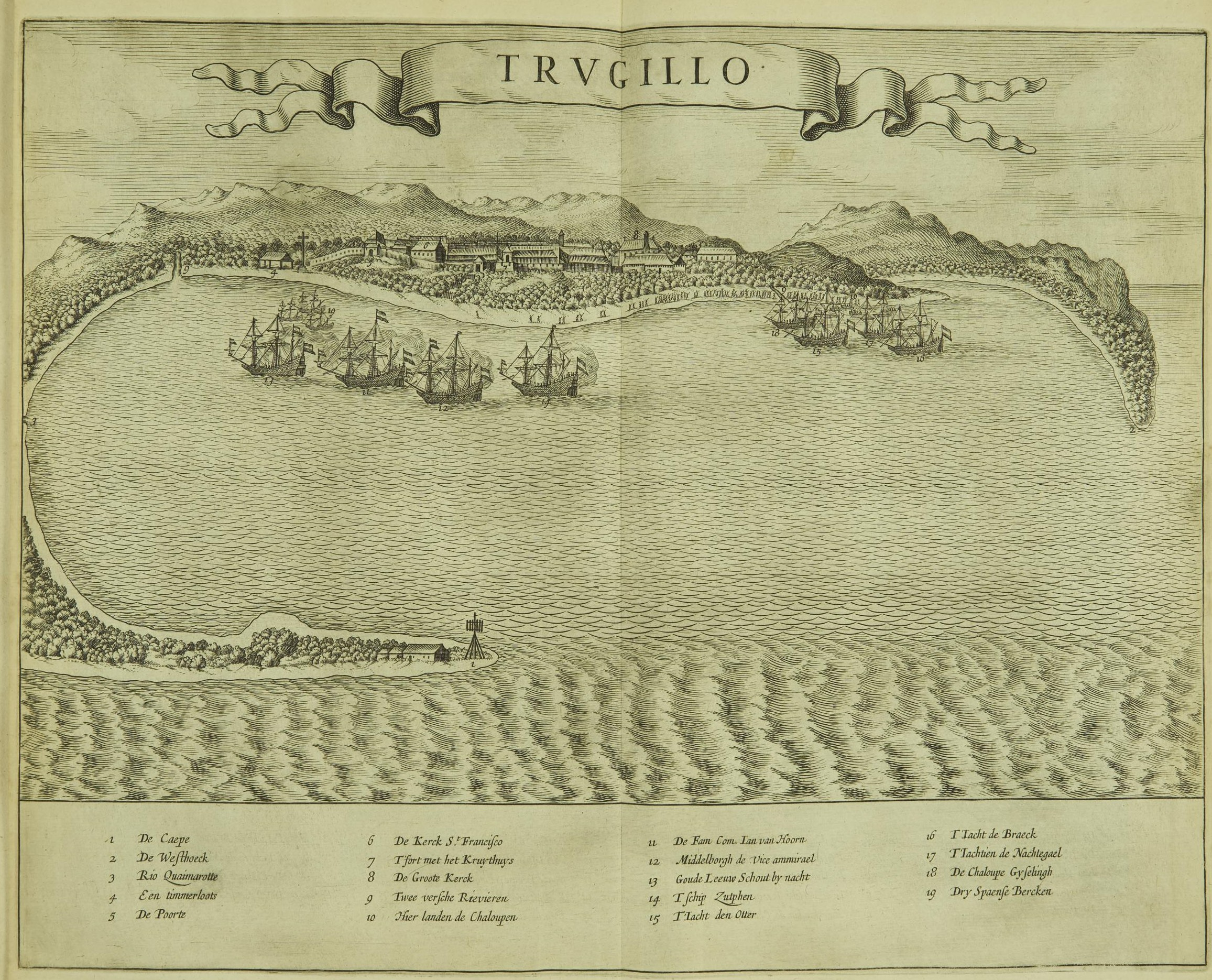
17th century Dutch map of Trujillo

Under Spanish rule Trujillo became the capital of Honduras, but because of its vulnerability the capital was changed to the inland town of Comayagua. The fortress, Fortaleza de Santa Bárbara (El Castillo), which sits on the bluff overlooking the bay, was built by the Spanish around 1550. Nevertheless, it was inadequate to really defend Trujillo from pirates—the largest gathering of pirates in history took place in the vicinity in 1683—or rival colonial powers: the Dutch, French, and English. The town was destroyed several times between 1633 and 1797, and during the eighteenth century, the Spanish all but abandoned Trujillo because it was deemed indefensible.

=== Republican period ===
When Honduras obtained its independence from Spain in 1821, Trujillo lost its status of capital city permanently first to Comayagua, which lost it to Tegucigalpa in 1880. From this same period onwards Trujillo began to prosper again.

In 1860, the mercenary William Walker, who was expelled in from Nicaragua in 1857, led an expedition intended to regain control of that country. He captured Trujillo with the intention to go across Honduras to Nicaragua. The Honduran Army and local volunteers presented a firm defense and with intervention of the Royal Navy, was captured and executed in Trujillo by orders of President Jose Santos Guardiola. His tomb is a local tourist attraction.

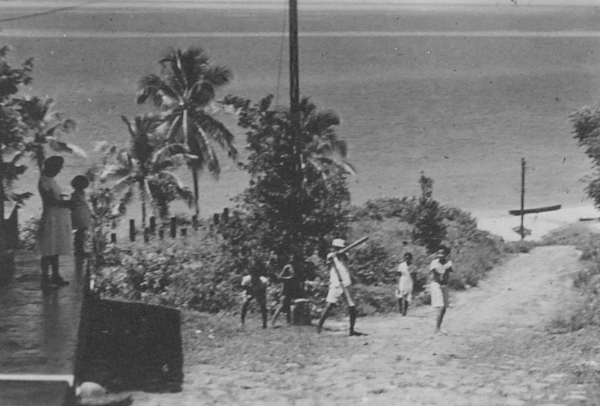
Seaside of the Town in 1951

American author O. Henry (William Sydney Porter) spent about a year living in Honduras, primarily in Trujillo. He later wrote a number of short stories that took place in "Coralio" in the fictional Central American country of "Anchuria", based on the real town of Trujillo. Most of these stories appear in his book Of Cabbages and Kings.

== Economy ==
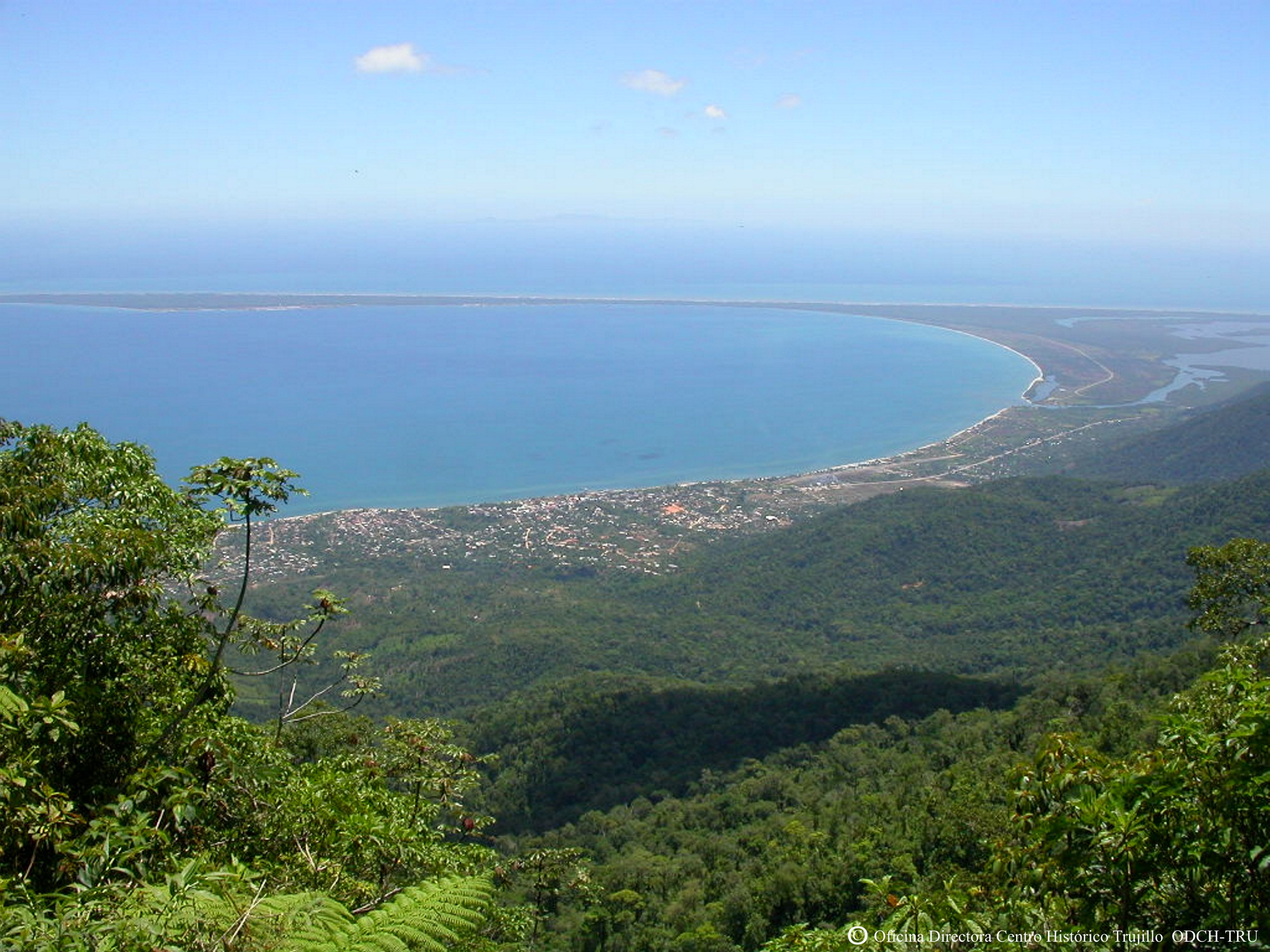
Town and bay viewed from the mountain

Historically, Trujillo was known for its cattle industry, alongside Omoa. Most of the cattle raised was retained for use by Hondurans, and not exported.

== Notable people ==
- Mirtha Colón (born 1951), activist
- Porfirio Lobo Sosa (born 1947), former president of Honduras

== See also ==
- Chapagua
- History of Honduras
- Federal Republic of Central America
- Trujillo, Spain
- Trujillo, Peru
