= Fortaleza de San Fernando =

Coordinates: 15°46′26″N 88°02′11″W

- Omoa, Honduras
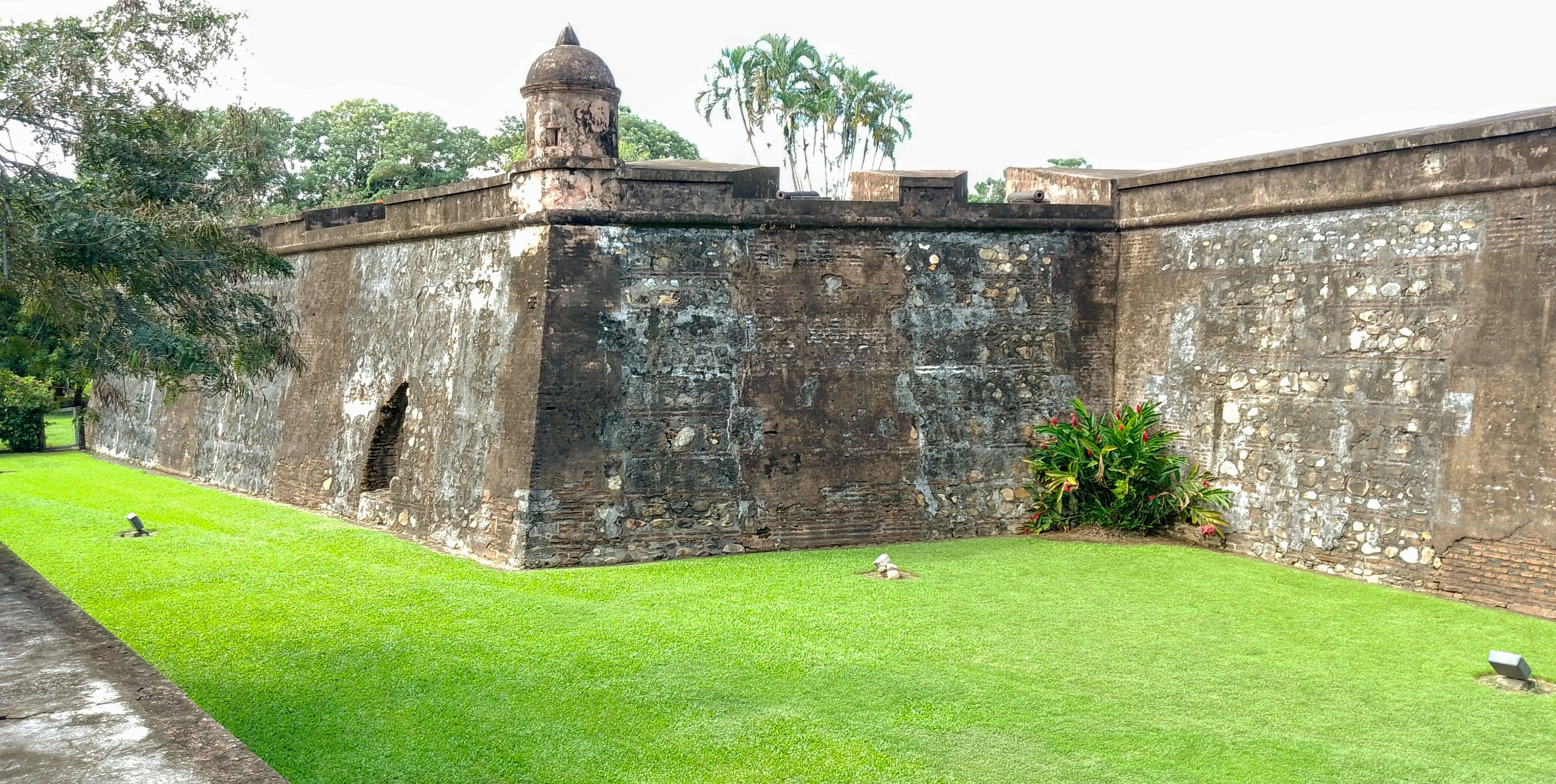
- Fortaleza de San Fernando

Site information
- Type: Fortress
- Owner: Honduras
- Controlled by: Honduras
- Open to the public: Yes
- Condition: Preserved

Location
- Location of the Fortaleza de San Fernando in Honduras

Site history
- Built: 1756
- In use: 1775–present
- Materials: Brick, river rocks, coral
- Battles/wars: Battle of San Fernando de Omoa (1779)

The Fortaleza de San Fernando (also known as the Castillo de San Fernando de Omoa) is a colonial-era Spanish fortress in Omoa, Honduras. Built between 1756 and 1775, the fortress guarded Spanish interests in the-then Captaincy General of Guatemala before being seized by the Honduran government in 1821. The fortress remains relatively intact, and is a major tourist attraction in Omoa.

== History ==
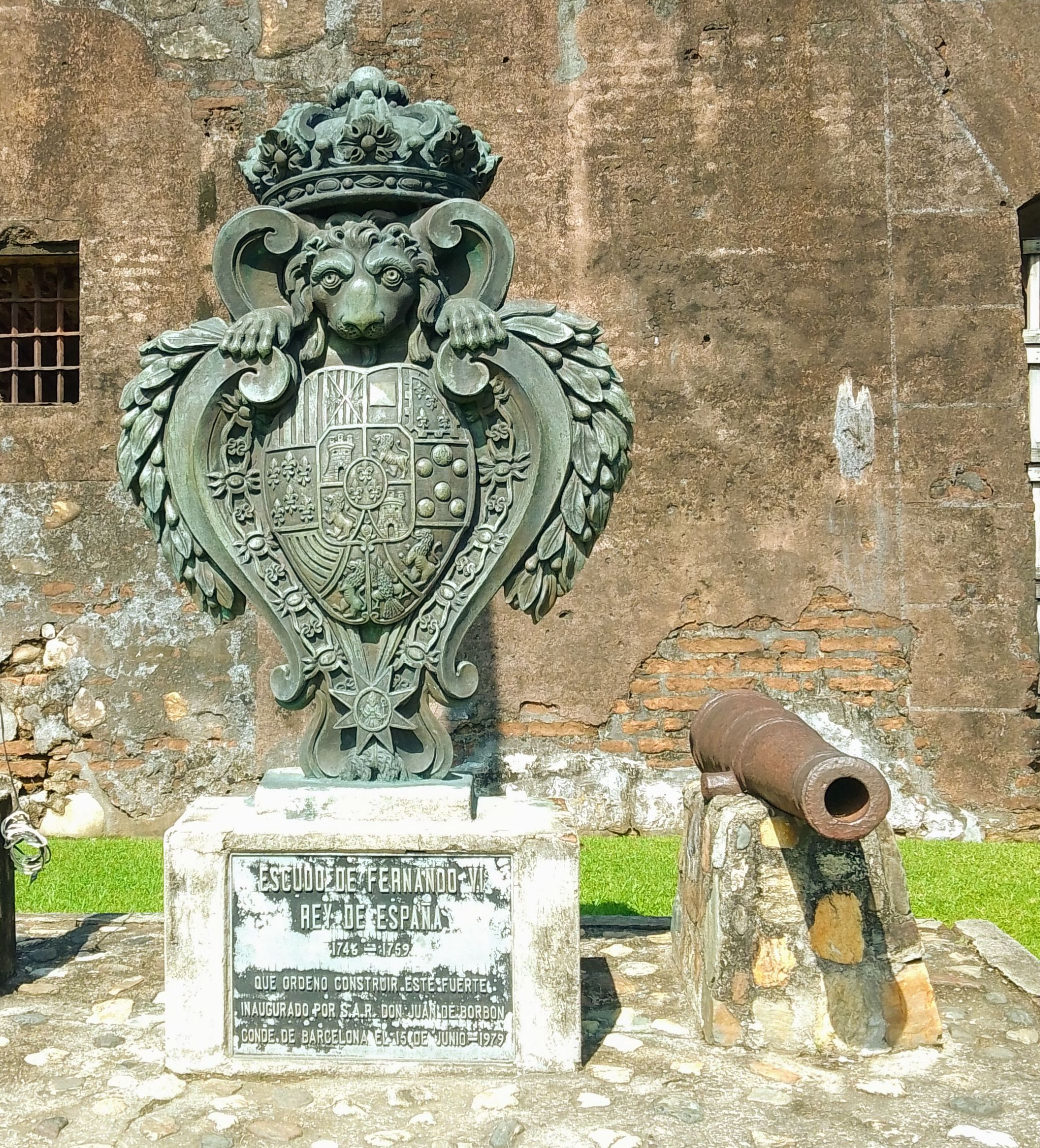
Coat of arms of King Ferdinand VI of Spain at the main gate

Following the Spanish conquest of Guatemala, the expanding Spanish Empire began to fortify its new holdings in the region. As part of this effort the Spanish constructed a small fort near the bay of Omoa, an important natural harbor, beginning centuries of Spain maintaining defensive works in Omoa. A native village existed in the area during the original fort's construction, but was soon depopulated, its inhabitants dispersed and put into forced labor under the Repartimiento.

By the late 16th century, piracy had emerged as a major problem for the Spanish government in the new world. Seeking to safeguard the lucrative silver trade, Spain reinforced the fort at Omoa, and the bay became a major port of export from which silver was shipped to Spain. In 1609 Omoa was put under the administration of the Captaincy General of Guatemala.

In the 18th century, the Spanish Empire decided that the bay of Omoa was a suitable location for a new settlement, and as such the Spanish establish a new port town—this would mark the beginning of the modern town of Omoa. To defend the new port, a larger fortress was planned to be constructed alongside the smaller fort. This more extensive fortification, named the Fortaleza de San Fernando, was built between the mid-18th century (sources differ if construction began in 1756, 1759, or 1768) and 1775. The fortress was built of brick and coral.

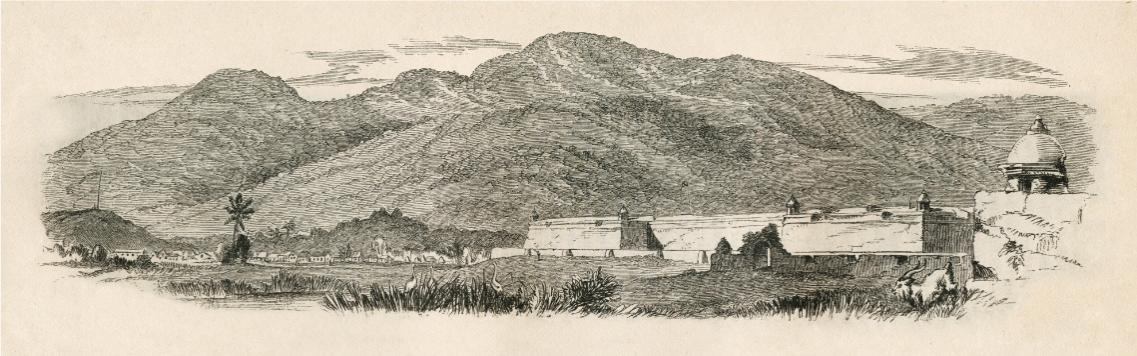
View to the fortress and the town.

The fort was first tested in 1779 when Spain—seeking to strike a blow against its longtime rival Britain—joined France and the nascent United States in the American Revolutionary War. Spain's entry into the conflict spurred the British to begin attacking Spanish colonies in Central America, including territories of Captaincy of Guatemala.

In October 1779, the fortress was besieged and captured by a small squadron of British ships. The Spanish counterattacked several weeks later, eventually forcing the British to withdraw.

By the 1820s, Spanish influence over its Central American colonies had waned significantly, with several former colonies gaining independence. The Fortaleza de San Fernando was one of the last Spanish strongholds to fall, with the fortress being captured by the First Mexican Empire in 1821. Control of the fort passed to the Federal Republic of Central America when the federation broke off from the Mexican Empire in 1823. When Honduras seceded from the federation in 1838, the fortress came under the control of the Honduran government, which used it as a prison.

The fortress was declared a nation monument in 1959, and is currently a tourist destination.

== Museum ==
The fortress of San Fernando de Omoa was proclaimed as a National Historic Center on May 11, 1959, since it is a clear example of Spanish rule on Honduran soil during the colonial era, in addition to having an invaluable historical value since it is about The largest military fortress built in Central America. Adjacent to it are the museum facilities that have historical and relevant material about the fortress, a model, armor they used, weapons of the time, etc.

== Gallery ==
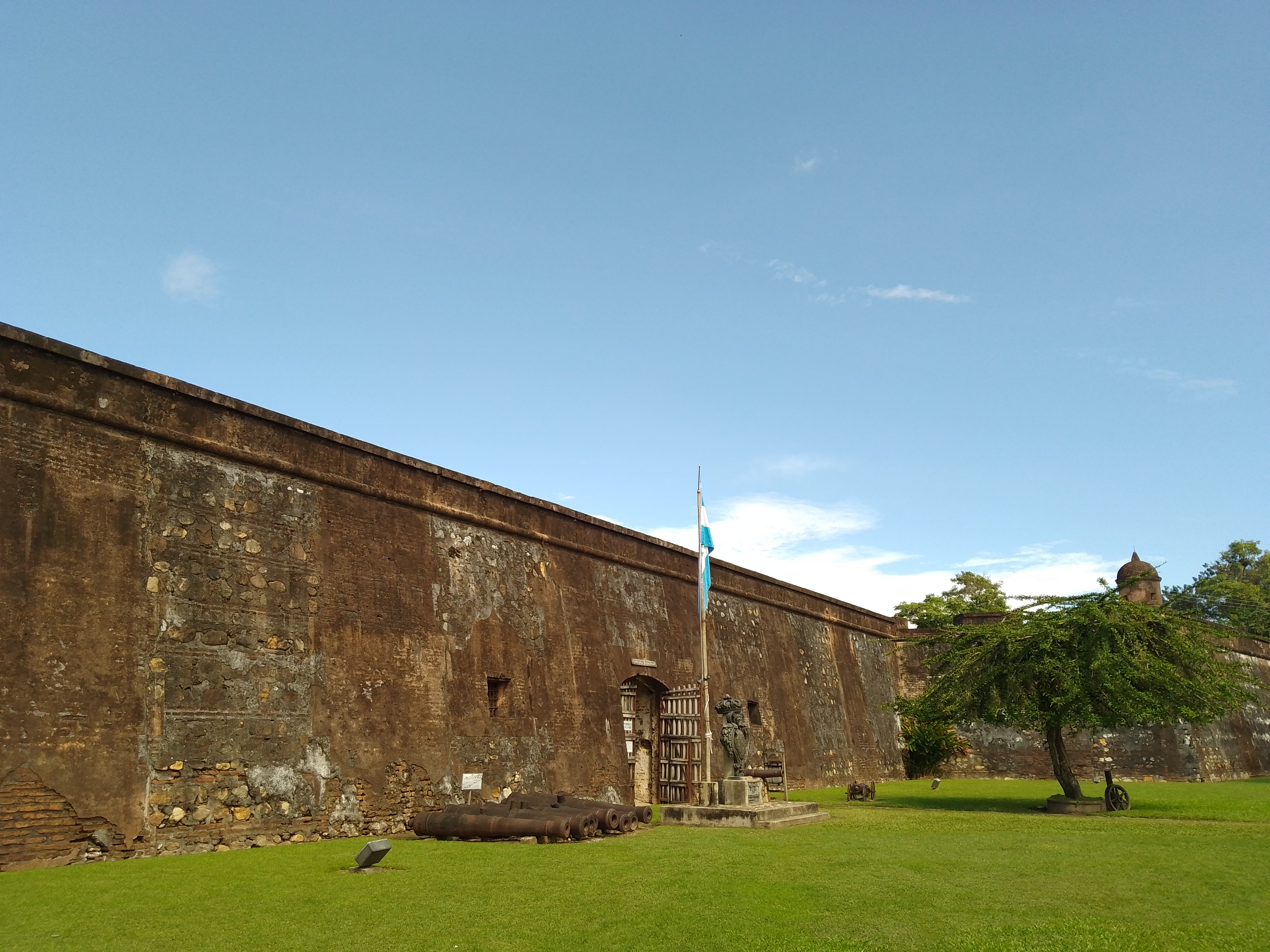
Main gate

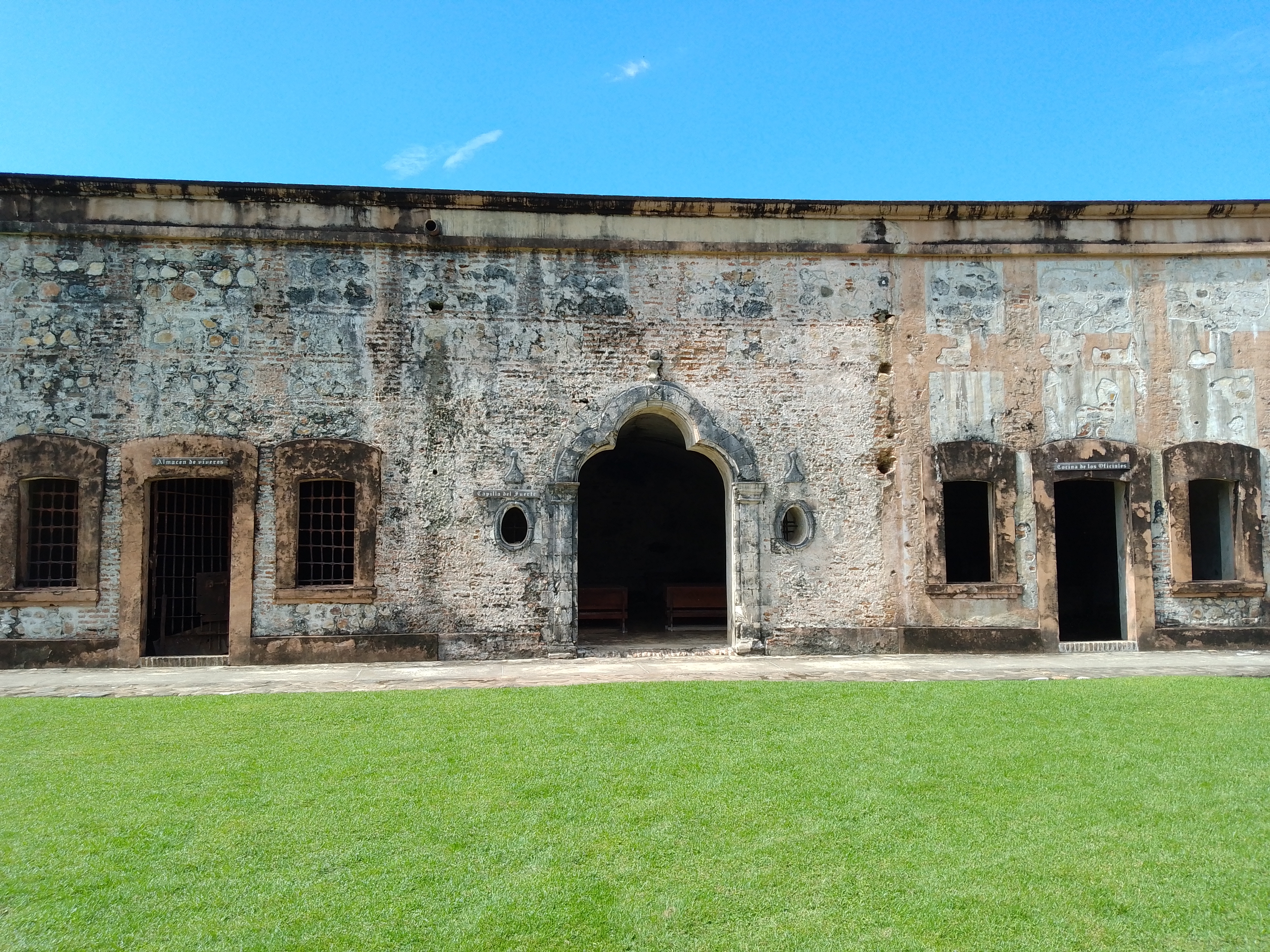
Warehouses and chapel

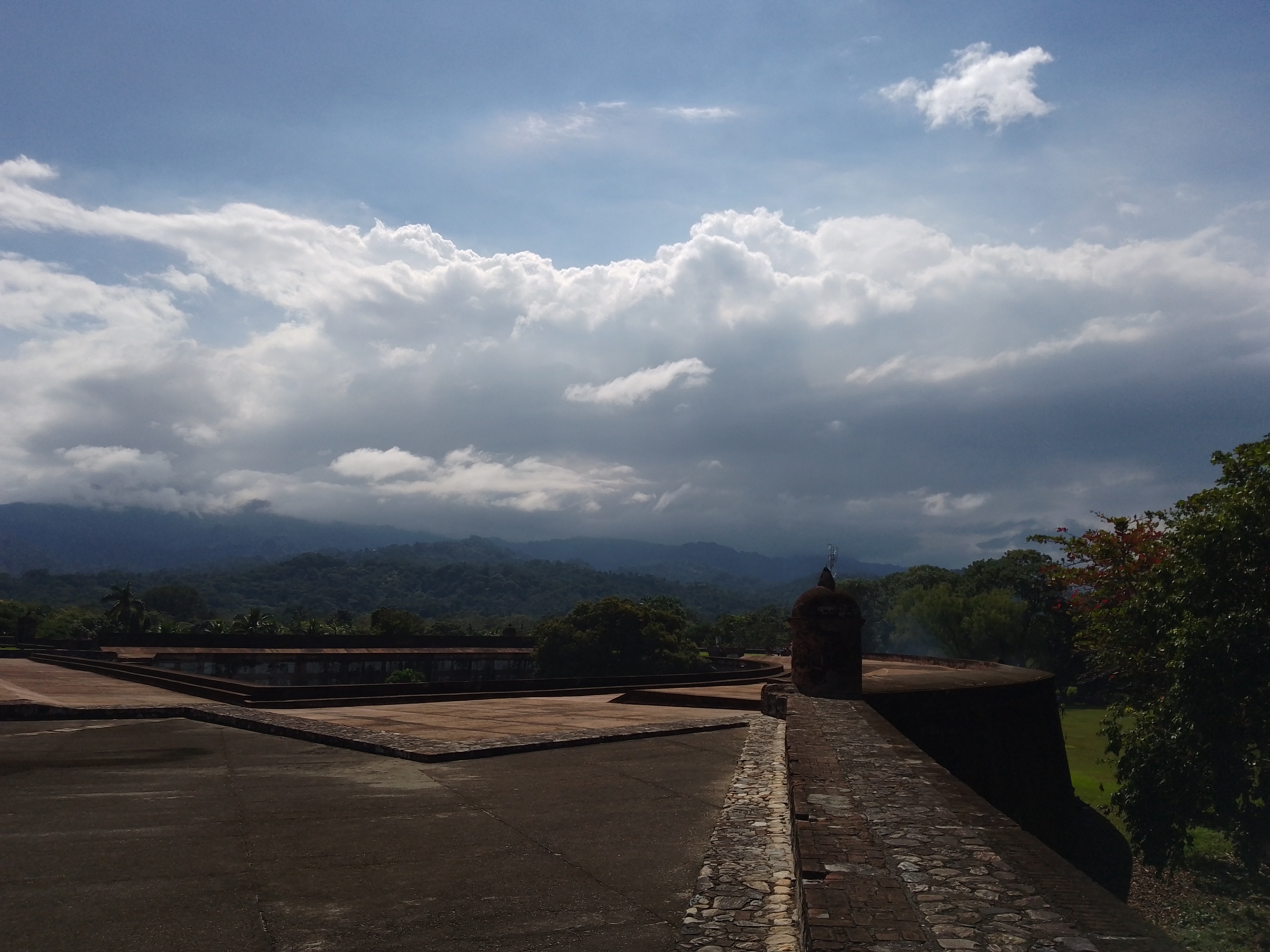
Rooftop

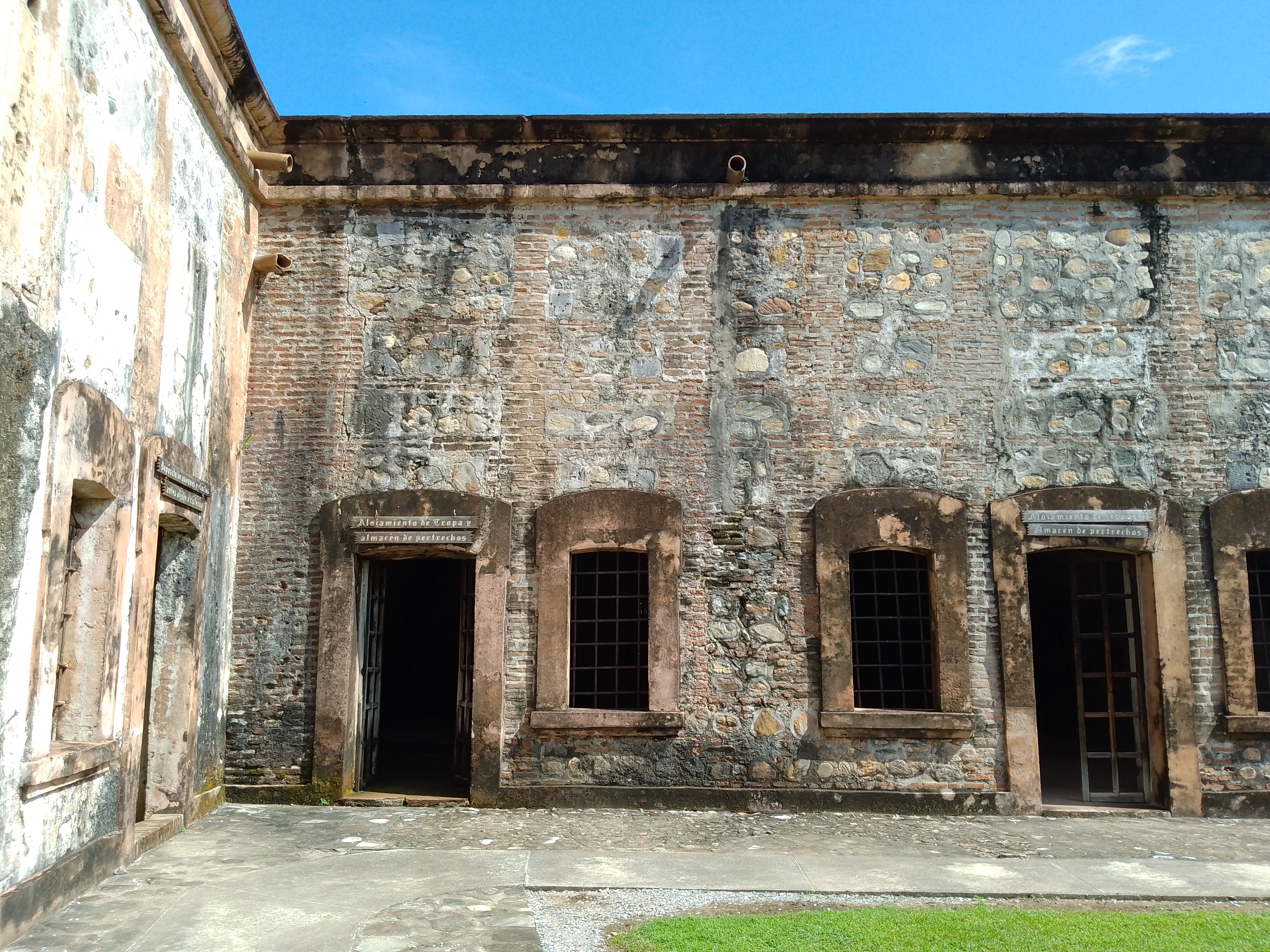
Warehouses and rooms

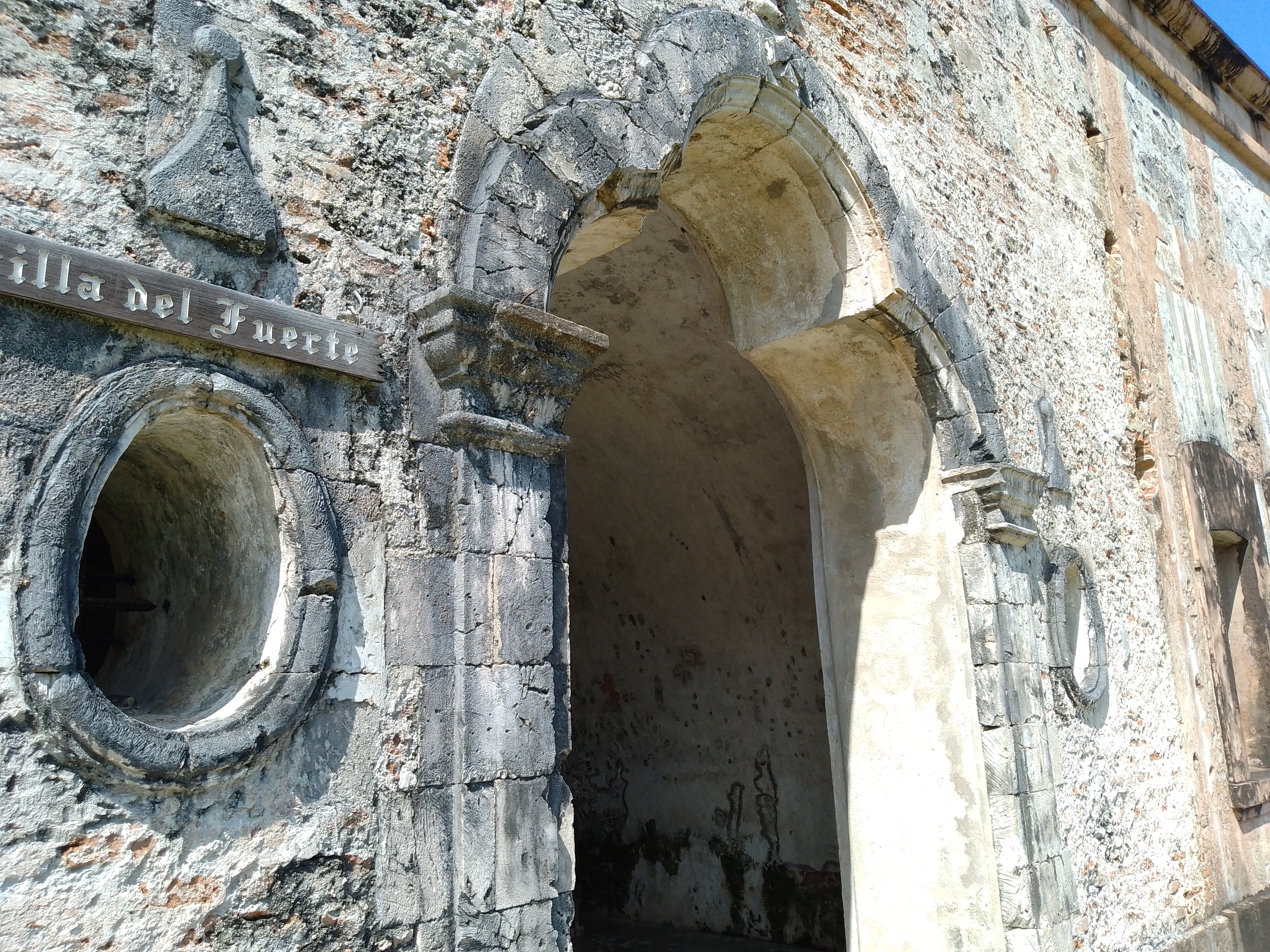
The chapel main entrance

== See also ==
- Santa Bárbara Fortress
- San Cristóbal Fortress
- History of Honduras
