= Omoa =

Omoa Omoa
- Municipality
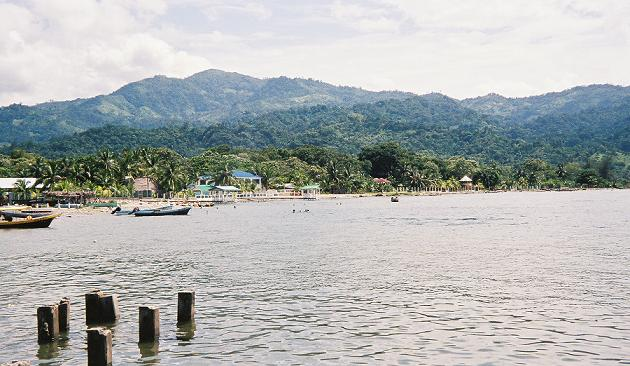
- Nickname: Omoa
- Location within Honduras
- Coordinates: 15°46′26″N 88°2′11″W
- Country: Honduras
- Department: Cortés
- Foundation: 1752

Area
  - Municipality: 394 km^{2} (152 sq mi)

Population (2023 projection)
  - Municipality: 58,172
  - Density: 148/km^{2} (382/sq mi)
  - Urban: 30,334
- Climate: Af

Omoa is a town and municipality with a population of 10,550 (2023 calculation) in the Department of Cortés in Honduras. Omoa is located on a small bay of the same name 18 km west of Puerto Cortés on the Caribbean Sea coast.

== Geography ==
Omoa is both a municipality and a small town located along the Northwest Caribbean coast of Honduras. It is populated by about 30,000 people distributed within an area of 382.8 km².

== History ==
In 1536 Omoa was a small "pueblo de indios" allocated in repartimiento by Pedro de Alvarado to Luis del Puerto along with the nearby Indian town of Chachaguala; by 1582 Omoa had ceased to exist as a viable community.

Repeated pirate raids on coastal towns along the Caribbean coast of Central America led the Spanish Crown as early as 1590 to begin looking for a new defensible port for the Captaincy General of Guatemala to export its goods to Spain. This initial study by Antonelli, and many subsequent ones, all pointed to the bay at Omoa as the most defensible location along the coast west of Trujillo (which already had a fort).

Omoa was founded again in 1752 as a Spanish colonial town. The then-governor of Honduras, Pantaleón Ibánez, described that the town they planned would include a hospital, a building for the royal treasury, a church, warehouses, barracks for soldiers, and houses for the officers. The town itself was to house the people who would build and occupy the two Spanish forts (El Real, and San Fernando de Omoa) which would guard the bay. Construction of El Real began in 1752 and was finished around 1756.

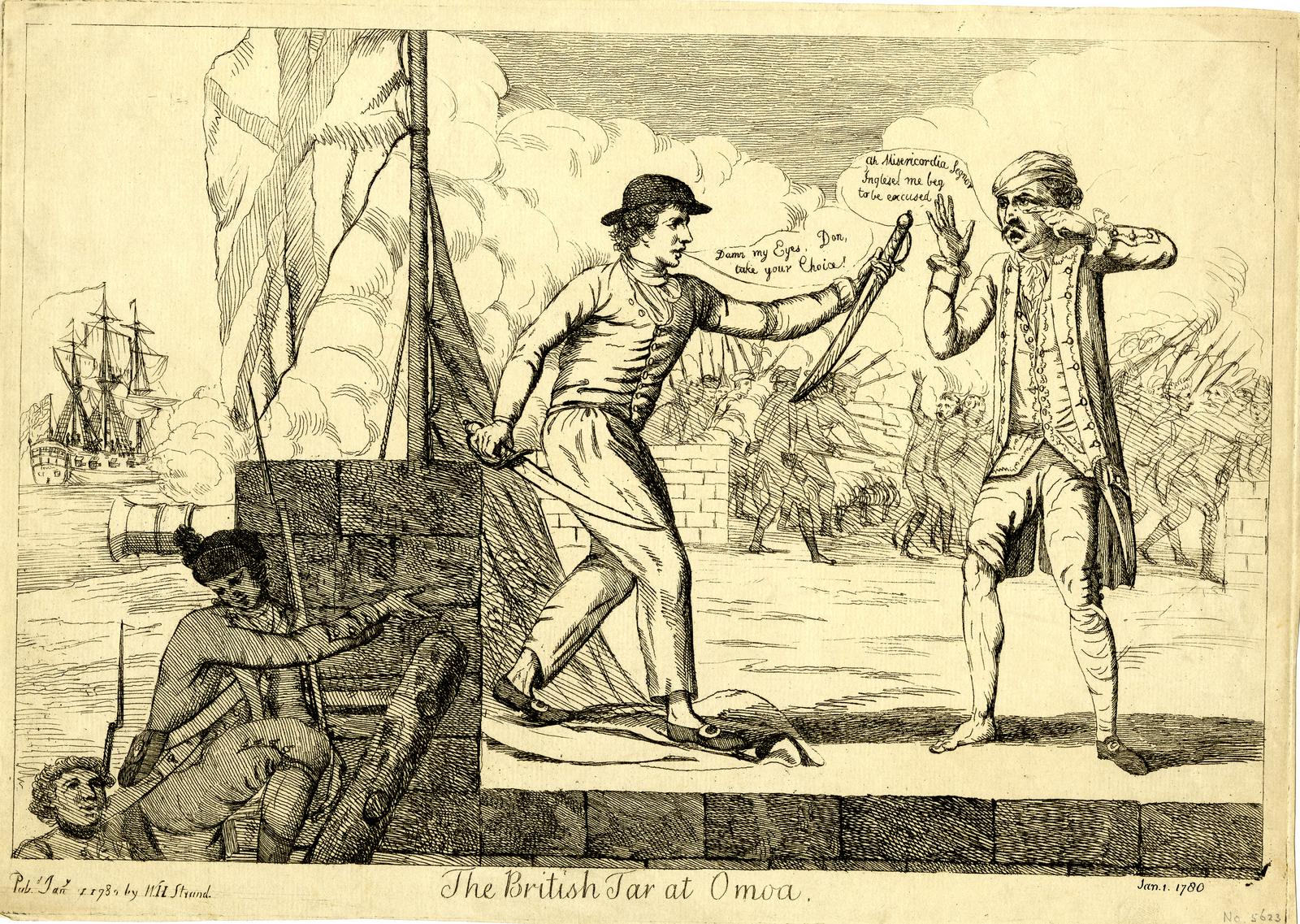
British invasion of Omoa in 1779.

El Real was used to defend the port town while the much larger fort of San Fernando de Omoa was built next to it. San Fernando de Omoa was finished around 1774. This historic place had as its main purpose to protect against the pirates that targeted the silver cargos originating from the mines of San Miguel of Tegucigalpa that often left from Omoa to Spain. Ironically, the construction of the fortress did not end until piracy had significantly declined. After the independence of Honduras in 1821, the fortress was used as a prison by the Honduran authorities through the 1950s. The English briefly occupied the town in 1779 and reportedly burned its 200 buildings.

In the late 18th century, Omoa had a diverse population of Spanish, Indians (mostly from central Honduras), enslaved Africans (the four contracts of royal slaves deployed to build and maintain the fort), mulattos, and free blacks (escaped English slaves, mostly from Belize).

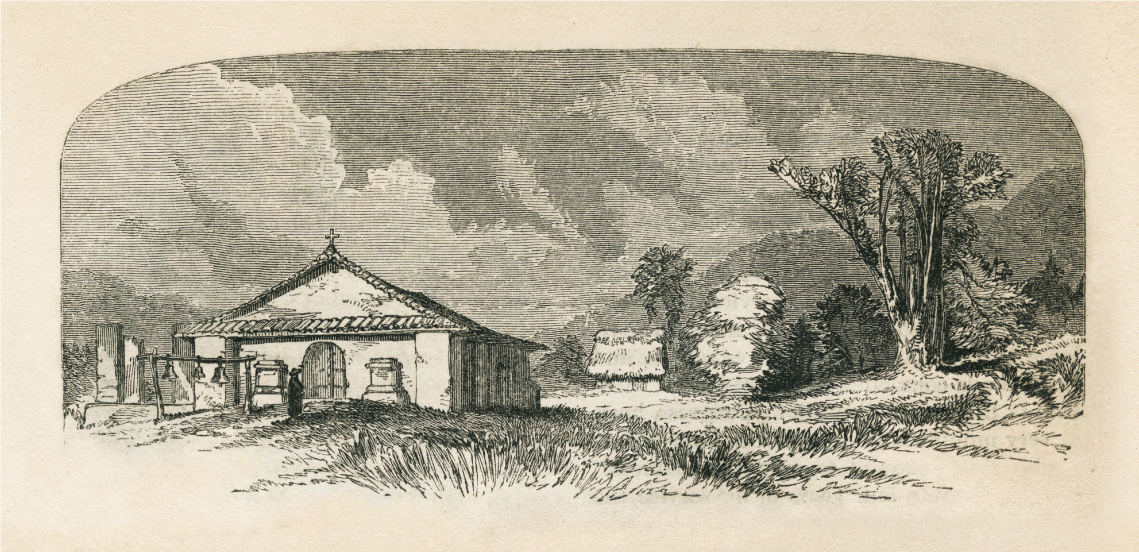
Omoa church in 1859.

For a very long time, Omoa was one of the most important ports in Honduras. Nevertheless, that importance began to fade in the 1820s when the place was destroyed a couple of times by fires, the bay began to silt up, and nearby Puerto Cortes was developed. Then the first railroad connecting Puerto Cortes with San Pedro Sula was developed in the 1880s, reducing Omoa to a fishing village.

== Economy ==
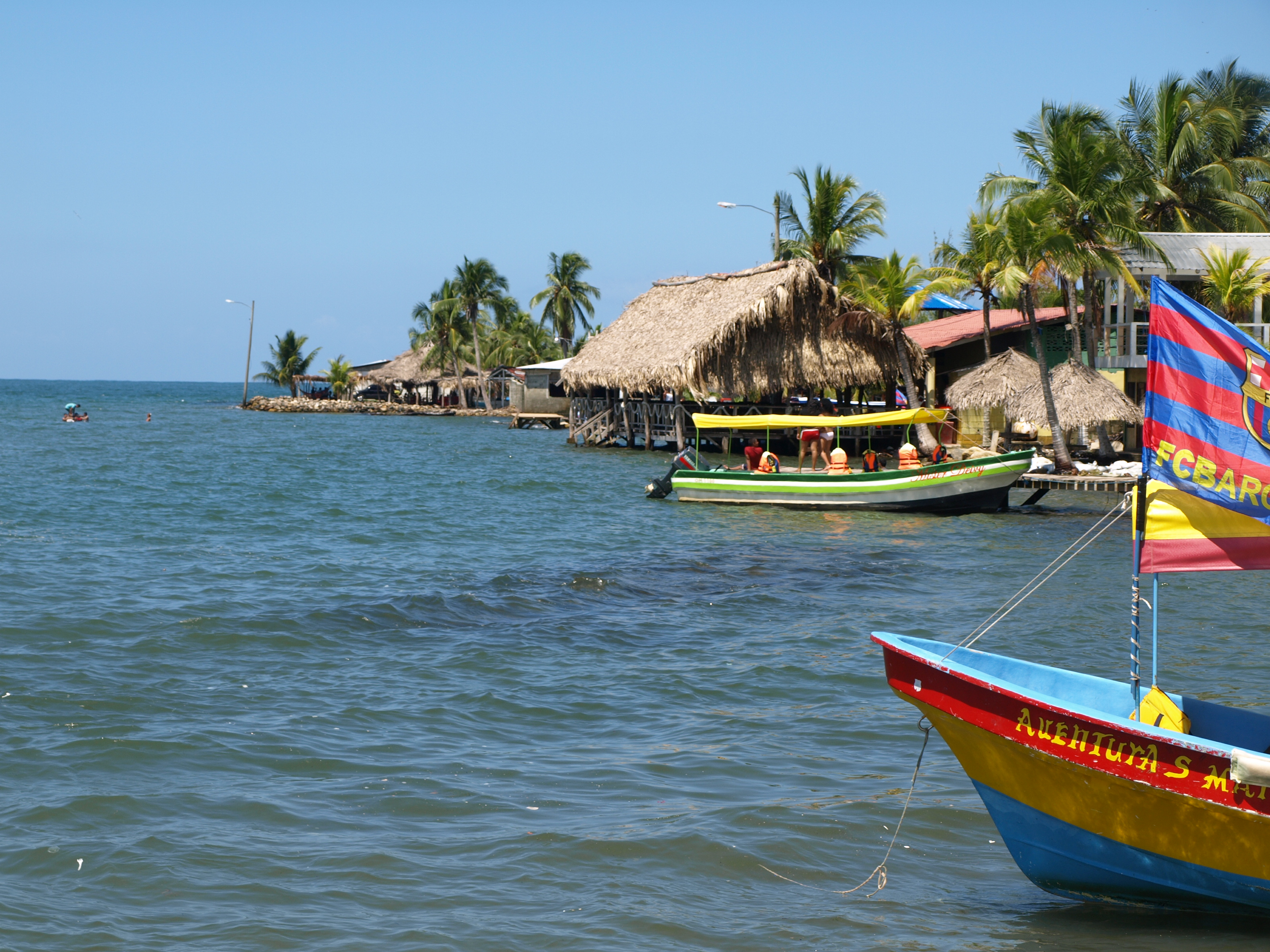
Tourism is the main economy of Omoa

Historically, Omoa had a cattle industry, with most of the cattle being maintained for Honduran use. Omoa has a large fishing industry. Other sources of income come from tourism and of the fortress of San Fernando, the largest of Central America and one of the few surviving colonial fortresses in the Americas.

== San Fernando of Omoa ==
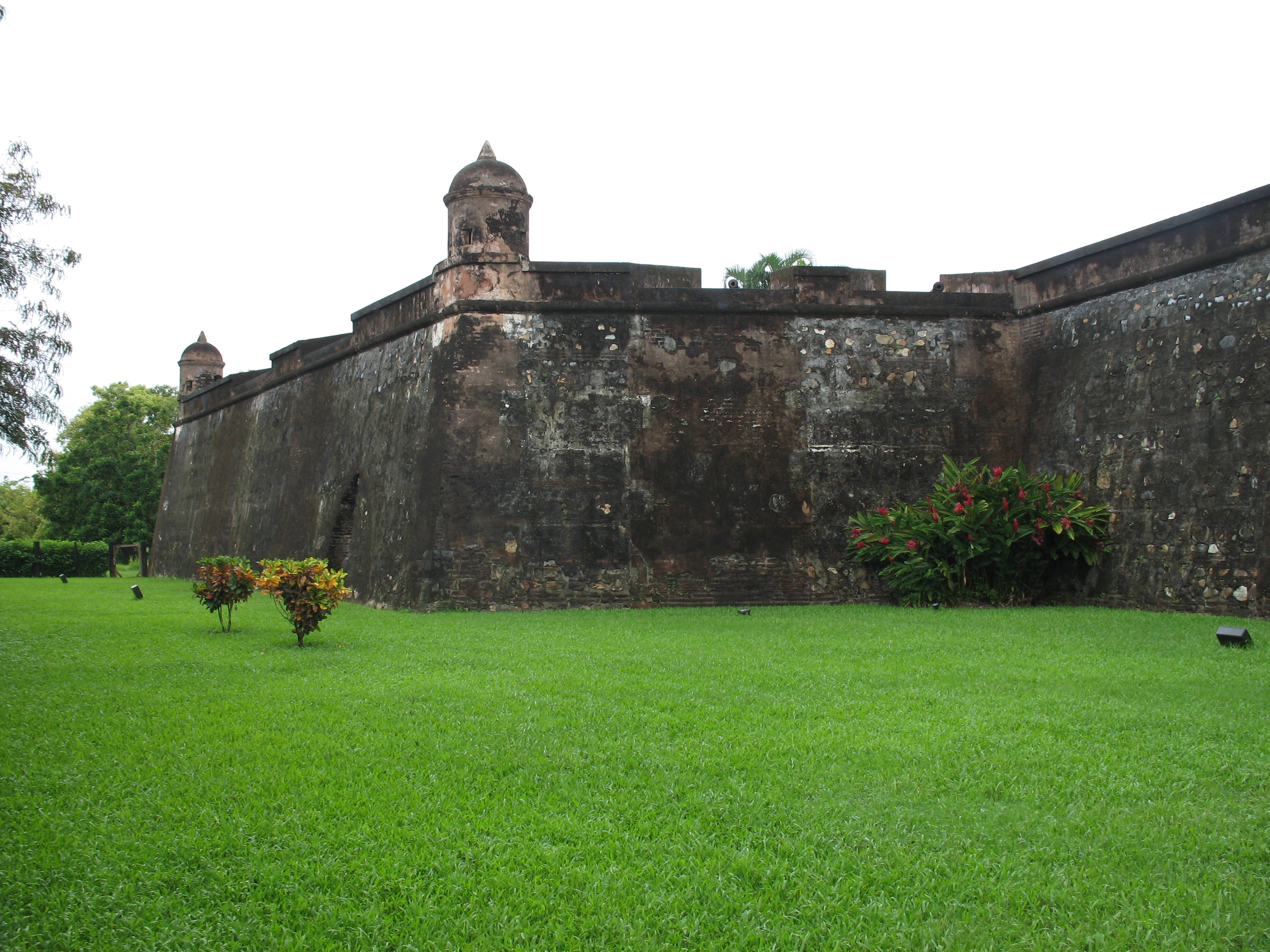
Exterior of the San Fernando Fortress

Omoa's most striking feature is the Fortaleza de San Fernando de Omoa, an 18th-century Spanish fort, though there are actually two forts there. The earlier Fort Real was started in 1752, and remodelled in 1759. Next to Fort Real, the Fort of San Fernando de Omoa was constructed from 1756 through 1775. A naval packet ship (paquebote) mounting 18 guns was built here for the Spanish Navy in 1757 that also carried the name San Fernando.

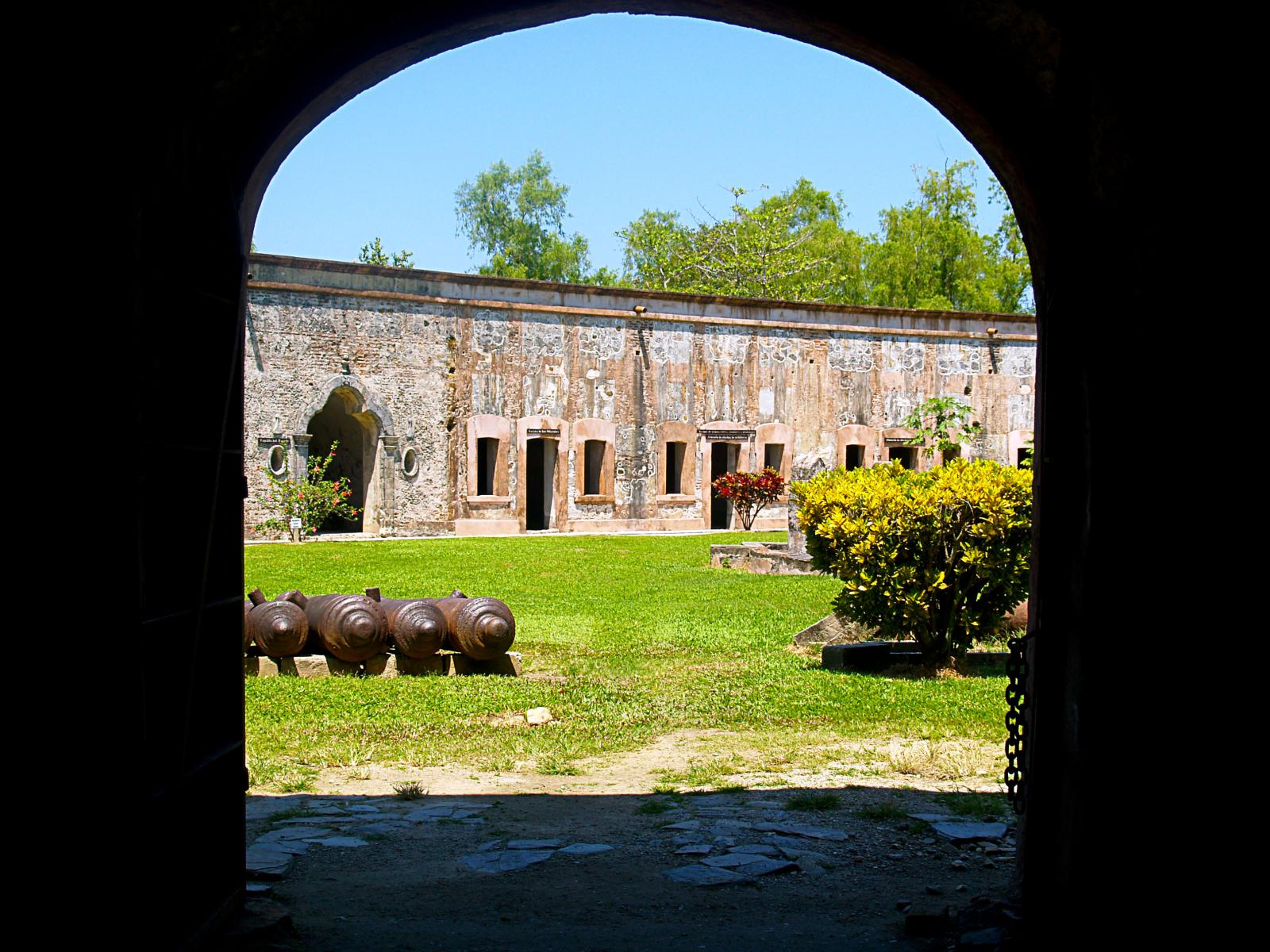
Interior

On 15 October 1779 the Royal Navy ships HMS Lowestoffe and HMS Charon were with a small squadron which arrived off the Honduras coast. They were accompanied by HMS Pomona, HMS Racehorse, a schooner and other small craft, and were hoping to intercept some treasure ships in the bay of Dulce. They found two Spanish ships which took shelter under the guns of the fortress of San Fernando de Omoa, and an unsuccessful attempt was made to capture the town from the sea. They fell in with the sloop HMS Porcupine and some troop transports returning from driving the Spaniards from St George's. On 16 October, this was followed by a landing some 9 miles away at Puerto Caballo by seamen and marines from the ships, a detachment of the Royal Irish Regiment and 250 Baymen to make an overland attempt on Omoa. They underestimated the difficulties of marching first through swamps, and then wild, mountainous country and only covered three miles during the night. However, when they reached the town the following afternoon it soon fell, but they were unable to take the fort because the Baymen had dropped the scaling ladders they were carrying. They were supported during the attack by fire from Charon and Lowestoffe, the latter being badly damaged when she grounded for a while as she tried to get closer.

The bombardment from the sea, supplemented by fire from some guns which had been landed from Pomona, continued on the night of 19 October, occupying the garrison which did not notice storming parties of seamen, marines and soldiers infiltrating the fort. The surprise was complete and there were only six British casualties. The treasure found in the fort and on board two treasure ships was worth some two million dollars. Two hundred and fifty quintals (equivalent to 14 metric tons) of mercury were also found in the fort. The fort itself was abandoned by the British at the end of November before a Spanish counterattack arrived. The craters from the British bombardment are still visible in the walls of the fort today.

Omoa was the last Spanish stronghold in Central America after the region declared its independence. The Spanish fort was captured by the Central American Republicans under Colonel Juan Galindo.

The fort was one of the few structures left standing after 1974's Hurricane Fifi destroyed the town and was a point of rescue operations afterward.
