= August 23 =

August 23 this year in various calendars
- Sunday, 23 August 2026
| Akan | Nkyikwasi |
| Armenian | 4 Hoṙi 1476 |
| Aztec | Atemoztli 5, 5 Ācatl |
| Babylonian | 9 Abu, 2337 SE |
| Balinese pawukon | Menga, Kajeng, Jaya, Paing, Urukung, Redite of Matal, Guru, Gigis, Sri |
| Bengali | 8 Bhadro, BS 1433 |
| Chinese | Yin Earth Snake・Room Mansion; Fire Horse Year, Month 7, Day 11 (Chushu, 15 days until Bailu) |
| Common Era | 23 August 2026 CE |
| Coptic | 17 Mesori, AM 1742 |
| Egyptian | 9 Tybi, 2775 NE |
| Ethiopian | 17 Naḥasē, 2018 Amätä Məhrät |
| French Republican | Décade I, Sextidi de Fructidor de l'Année 234 de la République |
| Gregorian | 23 August, AD 2026 |
| Hebrew | 10 Elul, AM 5786 |
| Hindu | Mūla・Viṣkambha; Solar: 7 Bhādrapada, 1948 SE; Lunisolar: Ekādaśī, Śukla pakṣa of Śrāvaṇa, 2083 VE; Rāudra・5127 KY・1,872,810 |
| Icelandic | Sunnudagur, 29 Heyannir 2026 |
| Islamic | 9 Rabi' al-awwal, AH 1448 (using tabular method) |
| ISO week date | 2026-W34-7 |
| Japanese | 11 Fumizuki, Reiwa 8 (Shosho, 15 days until Hakuro) |
| Julian | 10 August, AD 2026 (AM 7534) |
| Julian day | 2461276 |
| Korean | 11 Wonsungidal, 4359 DE |
| Maya | 13.0.13.15.13; 6 Mol, 5 Ben |
| Roman | ante diem IV Idus Augustas, MMDCCLXXIX AUC |
| Solar Hijri | 1 Shahrivar, SH 1405 |
| Tibetan | 11 gro bzhin, me pho rta 2153 or 1772 or 1000 |

| << | August | | | | | >> |
| Su | Mo | Tu | We | Th | Fr | Sa |
| | | | | | | 1 |
| 2 | 3 | 4 | 5 | 6 | 7 | 8 |
| 9 | 10 | 11 | 12 | 13 | 14 | 15 |
| 16 | 17 | 18 | 19 | 20 | 21 | 22 |
| 23 | 24 | 25 | 26 | 27 | 28 | 29 |
| 30 | 31 |
2026

August 23 in recent years
2026 (Sunday)
2025 (Saturday)
2024 (Friday)
2023 (Wednesday)
2022 (Tuesday)
2021 (Monday)
2020 (Sunday)
2019 (Friday)
2018 (Thursday)
2017 (Wednesday)

August 23 is the 235th day of the year (236th in leap years) in the Gregorian calendar; 130 days remain until the end of the year.

== Events ==
=== Pre-1600 ===
- 79 – Mount Vesuvius begins stirring, on the feast day of Vulcan, the Roman god of fire.
- 406 – The Western Roman army under Stilicho corners and defeats the Ostrogothic army in the battle of Faesulae.
- 476 – Odoacer, chieftain of the Germanic tribes (Herulic – Scirian foederati), is proclaimed rex Italiae ("King of Italy") by his troops.
- 1244 – Siege of Jerusalem: The city surrenders to the Khwarazmiyya, ending Christian control of Jerusalem for the next 672 years.
- 1268 – The Battle of Tagliacozzo: The army of Prince Conradin is nearly destroyed by Charles of Anjou, ending Hohenstaufen control over the Kingdom of Sicily and leaving the Angevins in control.
- 1305 – William Wallace is put on trial and subsequently hanged, drawn and quartered.
- 1328 – Battle of Cassel: French troops stop an uprising of Flemish farmers.
- 1382 – The Golden Horde, led by Khan Tokhtamysh, begins the Siege of Moscow, which ends four days later with the storming of the city and the death of Muscovite Prince Ostei.
- 1514 – The Battle of Chaldiran ends with a decisive victory for the Sultan Selim I, Ottoman Empire, over the Shah Ismail I, founder of the Safavid dynasty.
- 1521 – Christian II of Denmark is deposed as king of Sweden and Gustav Vasa is elected regent.
- 1541 – French explorer Jacques Cartier lands near Quebec City in his third voyage to Canada.
- 1572 – French Wars of Religion: Mob violence against thousands of Huguenots in Paris results in the St. Bartholomew's Day massacre.
- 1595 – Long Turkish War: Wallachian prince Michael the Brave confronts the Ottoman army in the Battle of Călugăreni and achieves a tactical victory.
- 1600 – Battle of Gifu Castle: The eastern forces of Tokugawa Ieyasu defeat the western Japanese clans loyal to Toyotomi Hideyori, leading to the destruction of Gifu Castle and serving as a prelude to the Battle of Sekigahara.

=== 1601–1900 ===
- 1628 – George Villiers, the first Duke of Buckingham, is assassinated by John Felton.
- 1655 – Battle of Sobota: The Swedish Empire led by Charles X Gustav defeats the Polish–Lithuanian Commonwealth.
- 1703 – Edirne event: Sultan Mustafa II of the Ottoman Empire is dethroned.
- 1775 – American Revolutionary War: King George III delivers his Proclamation of Rebellion to the Court of St James's stating that the American colonies have proceeded to a state of open and avowed rebellion.
- 1782 – British forces under Edward Despard complete the reconquest of the Black River settlements on the Mosquito Coast from the Spanish.
- 1784 – Western North Carolina (now eastern Tennessee) declares itself an independent state under the name of Franklin; it is not accepted into the United States, and only lasts for four years.
- 1799 – Napoleon Bonaparte leaves Egypt for France en route to seizing power.
- 1813 – At the Battle of Großbeeren, the Prussians under Von Bülow repulse the French army.
- 1831 – Nat Turner's rebellion of enslaved Virginians is suppressed.
- 1839 – The United Kingdom captures Hong Kong as a base as it prepares for the First Opium War with Qing China.
- 1864 – American Civil War: The Union Navy captures Fort Morgan, Alabama, thus breaking Confederate dominance of all ports on the Gulf of Mexico except Galveston, Texas.
- 1866 – The Austro-Prussian War ends with the Treaty of Prague.
- 1873 – The Albert Bridge in Chelsea, London opens.
- 1898 – The Southern Cross Expedition, the first British venture of the Heroic Age of Antarctic Exploration, departs from London.

=== 1901–present ===
- 1904 – The automobile tire chain is patented.
- 1914 – World War I: The British Expeditionary Force and the French Fifth Army begin their Great Retreat before the German Army.
- 1914 – World War I: Japan declares war on Germany.
- 1921 – British airship R-38 experiences structural failure over Hull in England and crashes in the Humber Estuary; of her 49 British and American training crew, only four survive.
- 1923 – Captain Lowell Smith and Lieutenant John P. Richter perform the first mid-air refueling on De Havilland DH-4B, setting an endurance flight record of 37 hours.
- 1927 – Italian anarchists Sacco and Vanzetti are executed after a lengthy, controversial trial.
- 1929 – Hebron Massacre during the 1929 Palestine riots: Arab attacks on the Jewish community in Hebron in the British Mandate of Palestine occur, continuing until the next day, resulting in the death of 65–68 Jews and the remaining Jews being forced to leave the city.
- 1939 – World War II: Nazi Germany and the Soviet Union sign the Molotov–Ribbentrop Pact. In a secret protocol to the pact, Poland, Finland, Estonia, Latvia, Lithuania, and Romania are divided into German and Soviet "spheres of influence".
- 1942 – World War II: Beginning of the Battle of Stalingrad.
- 1943 – World War II: Kharkiv is liberated by the Soviet Red Army for the second time after the Battle of Kursk.
- 1944 – World War II: Marseille is liberated by the Allied forces.
- 1944 – World War II: King Michael of Romania dismisses the pro-Nazi government of Marshal Antonescu, who is later arrested. Romania switches sides from the Axis to the Allies.
- 1944 – Freckleton air disaster: A United States Army Air Forces B-24 Liberator bomber crashes into a school in Freckleton, England, killing 61 people.
- 1945 – World War II: Soviet–Japanese War: The USSR State Defense Committee issues Decree no. 9898cc "About Receiving, Accommodation, and Labor Utilization of the Japanese Army Prisoners of War".
- 1946 – Ordinance No. 46 of the British Military Government constitutes the German Länder (states) of Hanover and Schleswig-Holstein.
- 1948 – The World Council of Churches is formed by 147 churches from 44 countries.
- 1954 – The first flight of the Lockheed C-130 multi-role aircraft takes place.
- 1954 – The Cruise of the Kings, a royal cruise organised by the Queen Consort of Greece, Frederica of Hanover, departs from Marseille, France.
- 1958 – Chinese Civil War: The Second Taiwan Strait Crisis begins with the People's Liberation Army's bombardment of Quemoy.
- 1966 – Lunar Orbiter 1 takes the first photograph of Earth from orbit around the Moon.
- 1970 – Organized by Mexican American labor union leader César Chávez, the Salad Bowl strike, the largest farm worker strike in U.S. history, begins.
- 1973 – A bank robbery gone wrong in Stockholm, Sweden, turns into a hostage crisis; over the next five days the hostages begin to sympathise with their captors, leading to the term "Stockholm syndrome".
- 1975 – The start of the Wave Hill walk-off by Gurindji people in Australia, lasting eight years, a landmark event in the history of Indigenous land rights in Australia, commemorated in a 1991 Paul Kelly song and an annual celebration.
- 1975 – The Pontiac Silverdome opens in Pontiac, Michigan, 30 miles (48 km) northwest of Detroit, Michigan.
- 1977 – Waylon Jennings arrested in a drug raid.
- 1985 – Hans Tiedge, top counter-spy of West Germany, defects to East Germany.
- 1989 – Singing Revolution: Two million people from Estonia, Latvia and Lithuania stand on the Vilnius–Tallinn road, holding hands.
- 1990 – Saddam Hussein appears on Iraqi state television with a number of Western "guests" (actually hostages) to try to prevent the Gulf War.
- 1990 – Armenia declares its independence from the Soviet Union.
- 1990 – West and East Germany announce that they will reunite on October 3.
- 1991 – The World Wide Web is opened to the public.
- 1994 – Eugene Bullard, the only African American pilot in World War I, is posthumously commissioned as Second Lieutenant in the United States Air Force.
- 2000 – Gulf Air Flight 072 crashes into the Persian Gulf near Manama, Bahrain, killing 143.
- 2006 – Natascha Kampusch, who had been abducted at the age of ten, escapes from her captor Wolfgang Přiklopil, after eight years of captivity.
- 2007 – The skeletal remains of Russia's last royal family members Alexei Nikolaevich, Tsarevich of Russia, and his sister Grand Duchess Anastasia are discovered near Yekaterinburg, Russia.
- 2010 – The Manila hostage crisis occurs near the Quirino Grandstand in Manila, Philippines, killing 9 people including the perpetrator while injuring 9 others.
- 2011 – A magnitude 5.8 (class: moderate) earthquake occurs in Virginia. Damage occurs to monuments and structures in Washington, D.C. and the resulted damage is estimated at 200 million–300 million USD.
- 2011 – Libyan leader Muammar Gaddafi is overthrown after the National Transitional Council forces take control of Bab al-Azizia compound during the Libyan Civil War.
- 2012 – A hot-air balloon crashes near the Slovenian capital of Ljubljana, killing six people and injuring 28 others.
- 2013 – A riot at the Palmasola prison complex in Santa Cruz, Bolivia kills 31 people.
- 2023 – Chandrayaan-3 mission initiates first Moon landing in Indian history.
- 2023 – A business jet carrying key leadership members of the Russian private military company Wagner Group crashes, killing all ten people on board.

== Births ==
=== Pre-1600 ===
- 1482 – Cho Kwangjo, Korean philosopher (died 1520)
- 1486 – Sigismund von Herberstein, Slovenian historian and diplomat (died 1566)
- 1498 – Miguel da Paz, Prince of Portugal (died 1500)
- 1524 – François Hotman, French lawyer and jurist (died 1590)
- 1579 – Thomas Dempster, Scottish scholar and historian (died 1625)

=== 1601–1900 ===
- 1623 – Stanisław Lubieniecki, Polish astronomer, theologian, and historian (died 1675)
- 1724 – Abraham Yates Jr., American lawyer and civil servant (died 1796)
- 1741 – Jean-François de Galaup, comte de Lapérouse, French admiral and explorer (died 1788)
- 1754 – Louis XVI of France (died 1793)
- 1768 – Astley Cooper, British surgeon and anatomist (died 1841)
- 1769 – Georges Cuvier, French biologist and academic (died 1832)
- 1783 – William Tierney Clark, English engineer, designed the Hammersmith Bridge (died 1852)
- 1785 – Oliver Hazard Perry, American commander (died 1819)
- 1800 – Evangelos Zappas, Greek patriot, philanthropist, and businessman (died 1865)
- 1805 – Anton von Schmerling, Austrian judge and politician (died 1893)
- 1814 – James Roosevelt Bayley, American archbishop (died 1877)
- 1829 – Moritz Cantor, German mathematician and historian (died 1920)
- 1843 – William Southam, Canadian publisher (died 1932)
- 1846 – Alexander Milne Calder, Scottish-American sculptor (died 1923)
- 1847 – Sarah Frances Whiting, American physicist and astronomer (died 1927)
- 1849 – William Ernest Henley, English poet and critic (died 1903)
- 1850 – John Cockburn, Scottish-Australian politician, 18th Premier of South Australia (died 1929)
- 1852 – Radha Gobinda Kar, Indian physician and philanthropist (died 1918)
- 1852 – Clímaco Calderón, Colombian lawyer and politician, 15th President of Colombia (died 1913)
- 1852 – Arnold Toynbee, English economist and historian (died 1883)
- 1854 – Moritz Moszkowski, Polish-German pianist and composer (died 1925)
- 1864 – Eleftherios Venizelos, Greek lawyer, jurist, and politician, 93rd Prime Minister of Greece (died 1936)
- 1867 – Edgar de Wahl, Ukrainian-Estonian linguist and academic (died 1948)
- 1868 – Edgar Lee Masters, American lawyer, author, poet, and playwright (died 1950)
- 1872 – Tanguturi Prakasam, Indian lawyer and politician, 1st Chief Minister of Andhra (died 1957)
- 1875 – William Eccles, English physicist and engineer (died 1966)
- 1875 – Eugene Lanceray, Russian painter and sculptor (died 1946)
- 1877 – István Medgyaszay, Hungarian architect and academic (died 1959)
- 1880 – Alexander Grin, Russian sailor and author (died 1932)
- 1882 – Volin, Russia anarchist intellectual (died 1945)
- 1883 – Jonathan M. Wainwright, American general, Medal of Honor recipient (died 1953)
- 1884 – Will Cuppy, American author and critic (died 1949)
- 1884 – Ogden L. Mills, American captain, lawyer, and politician, 50th United States Secretary of the Treasury (died 1937)
- 1890 – Harry Frank Guggenheim, American businessman and publisher, co-founded Newsday (died 1971)
- 1891 – Roy Agnew, Australian pianist and composer (died 1944)
- 1891 – Minna Craucher, Finnish socialite and spy (died 1932)
- 1894 – John Auden, English solicitor, deputy coroner and a territorial soldier (died 1959)
- 1897 – Henry F. Pringle, American historian and journalist (died 1958)
- 1900 – Frances Adaskin, Canadian pianist (died 2001)
- 1900 – Ernst Krenek, Austrian-American composer and educator (died 1991)
- 1900 – Malvina Reynolds, American singer-songwriter and activist (died 1978)

=== 1901–present ===
- 1901 – Guy Bush, American baseball player and manager (died 1985)
- 1901 – John Sherman Cooper, American captain, lawyer, and politician, 2nd United States Ambassador to East Germany (died 1991)
- 1904 – William Primrose, Scottish viola player and educator (died 1982)
- 1905 – Ernie Bushmiller, American cartoonist (died 1982)
- 1905 – Constant Lambert, English composer and conductor (died 1951)
- 1906 – Zoltan Sarosy, Hungarian-Canadian chess master (died 2017)
- 1908 – Hannah Frank, Scottish sculptor and illustrator (died 2008)
- 1909 – Syd Buller, English cricketer and umpire (died 1970)
- 1910 – Lonny Frey, American baseball player and soldier (died 2009)
- 1910 – Giuseppe Meazza, Italian footballer and manager (died 1979)
- 1911 – Betty Robinson, American sprinter (died 1999)
- 1911 – J.V. Cunningham, American poet, literary critic, and translator (died 1985)
- 1912 – Gene Kelly, American actor, singer, and dancer (died 1996)
- 1912 – Igor Troubetzkoy, Russian aristocrat and race car driver (died 2008)
- 1913 – Bob Crosby, American swing singer and bandleader (died 1993)
- 1917 – Tex Williams, American singer-songwriter and guitarist (died 1985)
- 1919 – Vladimir Abramovich Rokhlin, Azerbaijani mathematician and theorist (died 1984)
- 1921 – Kenneth Arrow, American economist and academic, Nobel Prize laureate (died 2017)
- 1921 – Sam Cook, English cricketer and umpire (died 1996)
- 1922 – Nazik Al-Malaika, Iraqi poet and academic (died 2007)
- 1922 – Jean Darling, American actress and singer (died 2015)
- 1922 – George Kell, American baseball player and sportscaster (died 2009)
- 1923 – Wynona Carr, American gospel, R&B and rock and roll singer-songwriter (died 1976)
- 1924 – Ephraim Kishon, Israeli author, screenwriter, and director (died 2005)
- 1924 – Madeleine Riffaud, French poet, journalist and Resistance member (died 2024)
- 1924 – Robert Solow, American economist and academic, Nobel Prize laureate (died 2023)
- 1925 – Robert Mulligan, American director and producer (died 2008)
- 1926 – Clifford Geertz, American anthropologist and academic (died 2006)
- 1926 – Gyula Hernádi, Hungarian author and screenwriter (died 2005)
- 1927 – Dick Bruna, Dutch author and illustrator (died 2017)
- 1927 – Allan Kaprow, American painter and author (died 2006)
- 1927 – Martial Solal, Algerian-French pianist and composer (died 2024)
- 1928 – Marian Seldes, American actress (died 2014)
- 1929 – Vladimir Beekman, Estonian poet and translator (died 2009)
- 1929 – Zoltán Czibor, Hungarian footballer (died 1997)
- 1929 – Peter Thomson, Australian golfer (died 2018)
- 1930 – Michel Rocard, French civil servant and politician, 160th Prime Minister of France (died 2016)
- 1930 – Vera Miles, American actress
- 1931 – Barbara Eden, American actress and singer
- 1931 – Hamilton O. Smith, American microbiologist and academic, Nobel Prize laureate (died 2025)
- 1932 – Houari Boumediene, Algerian colonel and politician, 2nd President of Algeria (died 1978)
- 1932 – Enos Nkala, Zimbabwean soldier and politician, Zimbabwean Minister of Defence (died 2013)
- 1932 – Mark Russell, American comedian and pianist (died 2023)
- 1933 – Robert Curl, American chemist, Nobel Prize laureate (died 2022)
- 1933 – Don Talbot, Australian swim coach and administrator (died 2020)
- 1933 – Pete Wilson, American commander and politician, 36th Governor of California
- 1934 – Sonny Jurgensen, American football player and sportscaster (died 2026)
- 1935 – Roy Strong, English historian, curator, and author
- 1936 – Rudy Lewis, American singer (died 1964)
- 1936 – Henry Lee Lucas, American murderer (died 2001)
- 1938 – Giacomo Bini, Italian priest and missionary (died 2014)
- 1938 – Roger Greenaway, English singer-songwriter and producer
- 1940 – Galen Rowell, American mountaineer and photographer (died 2002)
- 1940 – Richard Sanders, American actor and screenwriter
- 1940 – Thomas A. Steitz, American biochemist best known for his work on the ribosome (died 2018)
- 1941 – Onora O'Neill, Baroness O'Neill of Bengarve, British philosopher, academic, and politician
- 1941 – Barry Rushworth, Australian rugby league player (died 2026)
- 1942 – Nancy Richey, American tennis player
- 1943 – Dale Campbell-Savours, Baron Campbell-Savours, English businessman and politician
- 1943 – Nelson DeMille, American lieutenant and author (died 2024)
- 1943 – Peter Lilley, English politician, Secretary of State for Business, Innovation and Skills
- 1943 – Pino Presti, Italian bass player, composer, conductor, and producer
- 1943 – Rodney Alcala, American serial killer, rapist, and kidnapper (died 2021)
- 1944 – Antonia Novello, Puerto Rican-American physician and admiral, 14th Surgeon General of the United States
- 1945 – Rayfield Wright, American football player and coach (died 2022)
- 1946 – Keith Moon, English drummer, songwriter, and producer (died 1978)
- 1947 – David Robb, Scottish actor
- 1947 – Willy Russell, English playwright and composer
- 1947 – Linda Thompson, English folk-rock singer-songwriter
- 1948 – Atef Bseiso, Palestinian intelligence officer (died 1992)
- 1948 – Andrei Pleșu, Romanian journalist and politician, 95th Romanian Minister of Foreign Affairs
- 1948 – Rudy Ruettiger, American football player
- 1948 – Lev Zeleny, Russian physicist and academic
- 1949 – Vicky Leandros, Greek singer and politician
- 1949 – Shelley Long, American actress
- 1949 – Rick Springfield, Australian-American singer-songwriter, guitarist, and actor
- 1950 – Luigi Delneri, Italian footballer and manager
- 1951 – Mark Hudson, American record producer and musician
- 1951 – Jimi Jamison, American singer-songwriter and musician (died 2014)
- 1951 – Akhmad Kadyrov, Chechen cleric and politician, 1st President of the Chechen Republic (died 2004)
- 1951 – Queen Noor of Jordan
- 1952 – Santillana, Spanish footballer
- 1952 – Georgios Paraschos, Greek footballer and manager
- 1953 – Bobby G, English singer-songwriter
- 1954 – Charles Busch, American actor and screenwriter
- 1954 – Halimah Yacob, Singaporean unionist and politician, 9th Speaker and 8th President of Singapore
- 1955 – David Learner, British actor
- 1956 – Andreas Floer, German mathematician and academic (died 1991)
- 1956 – Valgerd Svarstad Haugland, Norwegian educator and politician, Norwegian Minister of Culture
- 1956 – Skipp Sudduth, American actor
- 1957 – Tasos Mitropoulos, Greek footballer and politician
- 1958 – Julio Franco, Dominican baseball player and manager
- 1959 – Edwyn Collins, Scottish singer-songwriter and guitarist
- 1959 – George Kalovelonis, Greek tennis player and coach
- 1960 – Gary Hoey, American guitarist, songwriter, and producer
- 1961 – Dean DeLeo, American guitarist and songwriter
- 1961 – Alexandre Desplat, French composer and conductor
- 1961 – Mohammad Bagher Ghalibaf, Iranian commander and politician, 54th Mayor of Tehran
- 1961 – Gary Mabbutt, English footballer
- 1961 – Hitomi Takahashi, Japanese actress
- 1962 – Martin Cauchon, Canadian lawyer and politician, 46th Canadian Minister of Justice
- 1962 – Shaun Ryder, English singer-songwriter and actor
- 1963 – Park Chan-wook, South Korean director, producer, and screenwriter
- 1963 – Glória Pires, Brazilian actress
- 1963 – Richard Illingworth, English cricketer and umpire
- 1963 – Kenny Wallace, American race car driver
- 1964 – Ray Ferraro, Canadian ice hockey player and broadcaster
- 1964 – Kong Hee, Singaporean minister and criminal
- 1965 – Roger Avary, Canadian director, producer, and screenwriter
- 1966 – Rik Smits, Dutch-American basketball player
- 1967 – Jim Murphy, Scottish lawyer and politician, Minister of State for Europe
- 1967 – Richard Petrie, New Zealand cricketer
- 1968 – Laura Claycomb, American soprano
- 1968 – Chris DiMarco, American golfer
- 1968 – Cortez Kennedy, American football player (died 2017)
- 1969 – Tinus Linee, South African rugby player and coach (died 2014)
- 1969 – Jack Lopresti, English soldier and politician
- 1969 – Jeremy Schaap, American journalist and author
- 1969 – Keith Tyson, English painter and illustrator
- 1970 – Lawrence Frank, American basketball player and coach
- 1970 – Jason Hetherington, Australian rugby league player
- 1970 – Brad Mehldau, American jazz pianist
- 1970 – Jay Mohr, American actor, producer, and screenwriter
- 1970 – River Phoenix, American actor (died 1993)
- 1971 – Demetrio Albertini, Italian footballer and manager
- 1971 – Tim Gutberlet, German footballer
- 1971 – Gretchen Whitmer, 49th Governor of Michigan
- 1972 – Mark Butcher, English cricketer and singer
- 1972 – Raul Casanova, Puerto Rican-American baseball player
- 1972 – Anthony Calvillo, Canadian football player
- 1972 – Martin Grainger, English footballer and manager
- 1972 – Manuel Vidrio, Mexican footballer, coach, and manager
- 1973 – Casey Blake, American baseball player
- 1973 – Kerry Walmsley, New Zealand cricketer
- 1974 – Lexi Alexander, American film and television director
- 1974 – Mark Bellhorn, American baseball player
- 1974 – Benjamin Limo, Kenyan runner
- 1974 – Konstantin Novoselov, Russian-English physicist and academic, Nobel Prize laureate
- 1974 – Ray Park, Scottish actor and stuntman
- 1975 – Eliza Carthy, English folk musician
- 1975 – Sean Marks, New Zealand basketball player and manager
- 1975 – Jarkko Ruutu, Finnish ice hockey player
- 1976 – Scott Caan, American actor
- 1976 – Pat Garrity, American basketball player and executive
- 1977 – Douglas Sequeira, Costa Rican footballer and manager
- 1977 – Jared Fogle, American spokesman and criminal
- 1978 – Kobe Bryant, American basketball player and businessman (died 2020)
- 1978 – Julian Casablancas, American singer-songwriter and producer
- 1978 – Randal Tye Thomas, American journalist and politician (died 2014)
- 1978 – Andrew Rannells, American actor and singer
- 1979 – Jessica Bibby, Australian basketball player
- 1979 – Saskia Clark, English sailor
- 1979 – Edgar Sosa, Mexican boxer
- 1979 – Zuzana Váleková, Slovak tennis player
- 1980 – Denny Bautista, Dominican baseball player
- 1980 – Nadine Jolie Courtney, American journalist, reality personality and author
- 1980 – Joanne Froggatt, English actress
- 1980 – Rex Grossman, American football player
- 1980 – Nenad Vučković, Serbian handball player
- 1981 – Carlos Cuéllar, Spanish footballer
- 1981 – Jaime Lee Kirchner, American actress
- 1981 – Stephan Loboué, Ivorian footballer
- 1982 – Natalie Coughlin, American swimmer
- 1982 – Scott Palguta, American soccer player
- 1982 – Cristian Tudor, Romanian footballer (died 2012)
- 1983 – James Collins, Welsh footballer
- 1983 – Athena Farrokhzad, Iranian-Swedish poet, playwright, and critic
- 1983 – Sun Mingming, Chinese basketball player
- 1983 – Tony Moll, American football player
- 1983 – Fiona Onasanya, British politician and criminal
- 1983 – Bruno Spengler, Canadian race car driver
- 1984 – Glen Johnson, English footballer
- 1984 – Eric Tai, New Zealand rugby player and actor
- 1985 – Valeria Lukyanova, Moldovan-Ukrainian model and singer
- 1986 – Sky Blu, American rapper and DJ
- 1986 – Neil Cicierega, American comedian and musician
- 1986 – Ayron Jones, American musician
- 1986 – Brett Morris, Australian rugby league player
- 1986 – Josh Morris, Australian rugby league player
- 1987 – Darren Collison, American basketball player
- 1988 – Olga Govortsova, Belarusian tennis player
- 1988 – Carl Hagelin, Swedish ice hockey player
- 1988 – Jeremy Lin, American basketball player
- 1988 – Kim Matula, American actress
- 1988 – Miles Mikolas, American baseball player
- 1989 – Lianne La Havas, British singer, songwriter, and multi-instrumentalist
- 1989 – Trixie Mattel, American drag queen, actor, and country singer
- 1989 – Heiko Schwarz, German footballer
- 1989 – TeddyLoid, Japanese musician
- 1990 – Seth Curry, American basketball player
- 1990 – Mike Yastrzemski, American baseball player
- 1992 – Nicola Docherty, Scottish footballer
- 1992 – Will Toledo, American singer-songwriter
- 1993 – Taylor Decker, American football player
- 1993 – Tyler Glasnow, American baseball player
- 1993 – Iván López, Spanish professional footballer
- 1994 – August Ames, Canadian pornographic actress (died 2017)
- 1994 – Jusuf Nurkić, Bosnian basketball player
- 1995 – Gabriela Lee, Romanian tennis player
- 1995 – Cameron Norrie, British tennis player
- 1996 – Alejo Igoa, Argentine YouTuber
- 1997 – Lil Yachty, American rapper and singer
- 1998 – P. J. Washington, American basketball player
- 1999 – Saya Sakakibara, Australian cyclist
- 2000 – Boryana Kaleyn, Bulgarian rhythmic gymnast and Olympic silver medalist

== Deaths ==
=== Pre-1600 ===
- 30 BC – Caesarion, Egyptian king (born 47 BC)
- 30 BC – Marcus Antonius Antyllus, Roman soldier (born 47 BC)
- 93 – Gnaeus Julius Agricola, Roman general and politician (born AD 40)
- 406 – Radagaisus, Gothic king
- 634 – Abu Bakr, Arabian caliph (born 573)
- 992 – Volkold, bishop of Meissen
- 1106 – Magnus, Duke of Saxony (born 1045)
- 1176 – Emperor Rokujō of Japan (born 1164)
- 1305 – William Wallace, Scottish knight and rebel leader (born c.1270)
- 1328 – Nicolaas Zannekin, Flemish peasant leader (in the battle of Cassel)
- 1329 – Frederick IV, Duke of Lorraine (born 1282)
- 1335 – Heilwige Bloemardinne, Christian mystic (born c. 1265)
- 1348 – John de Stratford, Archbishop of Canterbury
- 1363 – Chen Youliang, founder of the Dahan regime (born 1320)
- 1367 – Gil Álvarez Carrillo de Albornoz, Spanish cardinal (born 1310)
- 1478 – Johannes Pullois, Franco-Flemish composer (born c. 1420?)
- 1481 – Thomas de Littleton, English judge and legal author (born c. 1407)
- 1498 – Isabella of Aragon, Queen of Portugal, eldest daughter of Isabella I of Castile and Ferdinand II of Aragon (born 1470)
- 1507 – Jean Molinet, French poet and composer (born 1435)
- 1519 – Philibert Berthelier, Swiss soldier (born 1465)
- 1540 – Guillaume Budé, French philosopher and scholar (born 1467)
- 1568 – Thomas Wharton, 1st Baron Wharton (born 1495)
- 1574 – Ebussuud Efendi, Turkish lawyer and jurist (born 1490)
- 1591 – Luis de León, Spanish poet and academic (born 1527)

=== 1601–1900 ===
- 1618 – Gerbrand Adriaenszoon Bredero, Dutch poet and playwright (born 1585)
- 1628 – George Villiers, 1st Duke of Buckingham, English politician, Lord Lieutenant of Buckinghamshire (born 1592)
- 1652 – John Byron, 1st Baron Byron, English soldier and politician (born 1600)
- 1706 – Edward Nott, English politician, Colonial Governor of Virginia (born 1654)
- 1723 – Increase Mather, American minister and author (born 1639)
- 1806 – Charles-Augustin de Coulomb, French physicist and engineer (born 1736)
- 1813 – Alexander Wilson, Scottish-American poet, ornithologist, and illustrator (born 1766)
- 1819 – Oliver Hazard Perry, American commander (born 1785)
- 1831 – Ferenc Kazinczy, Hungarian author and poet (born 1759)
- 1831 – August Neidhardt von Gneisenau, Prussian field marshal (born 1760)
- 1845 – Thomas R. Gray, American author and diplomat (born 1800)
- 1853 – Alexander Calder, American lawyer and politician (born 1806)
- 1867 – Auguste-Marseille Barthélemy, French poet and author (born 1796)
- 1880 – William Thompson, British boxer (born 1811)
- 1892 – Deodoro da Fonseca, Brazilian field marshal and politician, 1st President of Brazil (born 1827)
- 1900 – Kuroda Kiyotaka, Japanese general and politician, 2nd Prime Minister of Japan (born 1840)

=== 1901–present ===
- 1924 – Heinrich Berté, Slovak-Austrian composer (born 1856)
- 1926 – Rudolph Valentino, Italian actor (born 1895)
- 1927 – Nicola Sacco, Italian anarchist convicted of murder (born 1891)
- 1927 – Bartolomeo Vanzetti, Italian anarchist convicted of murder (born 1888)
- 1933 – Adolf Loos, Austrian architect and theoretician, designed Villa Müller (born 1870)
- 1937 – Albert Roussel, French composer (born 1869)
- 1944 – Abdülmecid II, Ottoman caliph (born 1868)
- 1944 – Stefan Filipkiewicz, Polish painter and illustrator (born 1879)
- 1949 – Helen Churchill Candee, American geographer, journalist, and author (born 1858)
- 1954 – Jaan Sarv, Estonian mathematician and scholar (born 1877)
- 1960 – Oscar Hammerstein II, American director, producer, and composer (born 1895)
- 1962 – Walter Anderson, Russian-German ethnologist and academic (born 1885)
- 1962 – Hoot Gibson, American actor, director, and producer (born 1892)
- 1964 – Edmond Hogan, Australian politician, 30th Premier of Victoria (born 1883)
- 1966 – Francis X. Bushman, American actor, director, and screenwriter (born 1883)
- 1967 – Georges Berger, Belgian race car driver (born 1918)
- 1967 – Nathaniel Cartmell, American runner and coach (born 1883)
- 1974 – Roberto Assagioli, Italian psychiatrist and author (born 1888)
- 1975 – Faruk Gürler, Turkish general (born 1913)
- 1977 – Naum Gabo, Russian sculptor and academic (born 1890)
- 1982 – Stanford Moore, American biochemist and academic, Nobel Prize laureate (born 1913)
- 1987 – Didier Pironi, French race car and boat driver (born 1952)
- 1989 – Mohammed Abed Elhai, Sudanese poet and academic (born 1944)
- 1989 – R. D. Laing, Scottish psychiatrist and author (born 1927)
- 1990 – David Rose, American pianist and composer (born 1910)
- 1994 – Zoltán Fábri, Hungarian director and screenwriter (born 1917)
- 1995 – Alfred Eisenstaedt, German-American photographer and journalist (born 1898)
- 1996 – Margaret Tucker, Australian author and activist (born 1904)
- 1997 – Eric Gairy, Grenadian educator and politician, 1st Prime Minister of Grenada (born 1922)
- 1997 – John Kendrew, English biochemist and crystallographer, Nobel Prize laureate (born 1917)
- 1999 – Norman Wexler, American screenwriter (born 1926)
- 1999 – James White, Irish author (born 1928)
- 2000 – John Anthony Kaiser, American priest and missionary (born 1932)
- 2001 – Kathleen Freeman, American actress (born 1919)
- 2001 – Peter Maas, American journalist and author (born 1929)
- 2002 – Hoyt Wilhelm, American baseball player and coach (born 1922)
- 2003 – Bobby Bonds, American baseball player and manager (born 1946)
- 2003 – Jack Dyer, Australian footballer and coach (born 1913)
- 2003 – Jan Sedivka, Czech-Australian violinist and educator (born 1917)
- 2003 – Michael Kijana Wamalwa, Kenyan lawyer and politician, 8th Vice President of Kenya (born 1944)
- 2005 – Brock Peters, American actor (born 1927)
- 2006 – Maynard Ferguson, Canadian trumpet player and bandleader (born 1928)
- 2008 – John Russell, English-American author and critic (born 1919)
- 2012 – Jerry Nelson, American puppeteer and voice actor (born 1934)
- 2012 – Josepha Sherman, American anthologist and author (born 1946)
- 2013 – Richard J. Corman, American businessman, founded the R.J. Corman Railroad Group (born 1955)
- 2013 – William Glasser, American psychiatrist and author (born 1925)
- 2013 – Charles Lisanby, American production designer and set director (born 1924)
- 2013 – Konstanty Miodowicz, Polish ethnographer and politician (born 1951)
- 2013 – Vesna Rožič, Slovenian chess player (born 1987)
- 2013 – Tatyana Zaslavskaya, Russian sociologist and economist (born 1927)
- 2014 – Albert Ebossé Bodjongo, Cameroonian footballer (born 1989)
- 2014 – Annefleur Kalvenhaar, Dutch cyclist (born 1994)
- 2014 – Birgitta Stenberg, Swedish author and illustrator (born 1932)
- 2014 – Jaume Vallcorba Plana, Spanish philologist and publisher (born 1949)
- 2015 – Augusta Chiwy, Congolese-Belgian nurse (born 1921)
- 2015 – Guy Ligier, French rugby player and race car driver (born 1930)
- 2015 – Enrique Reneau, Honduran footballer (born 1971)
- 2015 – Paul Royle, Australian lieutenant and pilot (born 1914)
- 2021 – Elizabeth Blackadder, Scottish painter and printmaker (born 1931)
- 2023 – Dmitry Utkin, Russian army officer, founder of Wagner Group (born 1970)
- 2023 – Yevgeny Prigozhin, Russian businessman, chief of Wagner Group (born 1961)
- 2023 – Terry Funk, American professional wrestler (born 1944)
- 2026 – Klaus-Michael Kühne, German billionaire and businessman (born 1937)

== Holidays and observances ==
- Battle of Kursk Day (Russia)
- Christian feast day:
  - Ascelina
  - Asterius, Claudius, and Neon
  - Éogan of Ardstraw
  - Blessed Franciszek Dachtera
  - Blessed Juan María de la Cruz
  - Lupus (Luppus) of Novae
  - Philip Benitius
  - Quiriacus and companions, of Ostia
  - Rose of Lima
  - Tydfil
  - Zacchaeus of Jerusalem
  - August 23 (Eastern Orthodox liturgics)
- Day of the National Flag (Ukraine)
- European Day of Remembrance for Victims of Stalinism and Nazism or Black Ribbon Day (European Union and other countries), and related observances:
  - Liberation from Fascist Occupation Day (Romania)
- International Day for the Remembrance of the Slave Trade and its Abolition
- National Day for Physicians (Iran)
- The memorial day for the Second Taiwan Strait Crisis(the August 23 shelling war) (Taiwan)
