= HMS Actaeon (1778) =

Fifth-rate of the Royal Navy

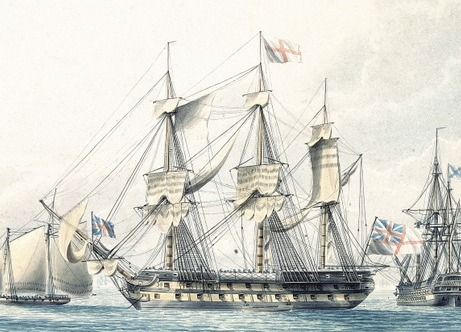
- Actaeon's sister ship HMS Argo

History

United Kingdom
- Name: HMS Actaeon
- Namesake: Actaeon
- Ordered: 3 July 1776
- Builder: Randall & Co, Rotherhithe
- Cost: £17,940
- Laid down: July 1776
- Launched: 29 January 1778
- Completed: 17 April 1778
- Commissioned: January 1778
- Fate: Sold 30 April 1802

General characteristics
- Class & type: Roebuck-class fifth-rate
- Tons burthen: 887 8/94 (bm)
- Length: 140 ft 1 1/2 in (42.7 m) (gun deck); 115 ft 10 1/2 in (35.3 m) (keel)
- Beam: 37 ft 11 1/4 in (11.6 m)
- Draught: 9 ft 8 in (2.9 m) (forward); 14 ft 6 in (4.4 m) (aft)
- Depth of hold: 16 ft 4 in (5 m)
- Propulsion: Sails
- Complement: 280 (300 from 1783)
- Armament: Lower deck: 20 × 18-pounder guns; Upper deck: 22 × 9-pounder guns; Quarterdeck: Nil; Forecastle: 2 × 6-pounder guns

HMS Actaeon was a 44-gun fifth-rate Roebuck-class ship of the Royal Navy launched in 1778. Commissioned in the same year, the ship served throughout the remainder of the American Revolutionary War. After initially serving in the North Sea and in the defence of the Channel Islands, in 1779 Actaeon joined the Jamaica Station, participating in the capture of Goree on 8 May as she travelled there. She spent time guarding Saint Lucia and Tobago, going to Britain to be repaired before returning to Jamaica in 1781. The ship formed part of a squadron that supported Edward Despard in his capture of the Black River settlement at the Battle of the Black River on 30 August 1782, and then returned to Jamaica to spend the rest of the war patrolling the West Indies.

Converted into a troop ship in 1787, Actaeon conveyed soldiers to various British colonies, including to Jamaica in 1790 during the Spanish Armament. Paid off in 1791, the ship was recommissioned in 1795 to serve as a receiving ship during the French Revolutionary Wars. Operating at Liverpool, the ship formed part of the Impress Service and also operated as a guard ship, seizing several Russian and Scandinavian ships in 1800 and 1801. Actaeon was sold on 30 April 1802 to be broken up.

== Design ==
Actaeon was a 44-gun, 18-pounder Roebuck-class ship. The class was a revival of the design used to construct the fifth-rate HMS Roebuck in 1769, by Sir Thomas Slade. The ships, while classified as fifth-rates, were not frigates because they carried two gun decks, of which a frigate would have only one. Roebuck was designed as such to provide the extra firepower a ship of two decks could bring to warfare but with a much lower draught and smaller profile. From 1751 to 1776 only two ships of this type were built for the Royal Navy because it was felt that they were anachronistic, with the lower (and more heavily armed) deck of guns being so low as to be unusable in anything but the calmest of waters. (Note: This problem was demonstrated in a sister ship of Actaeon, HMS Argo, which two French frigates captured in 1783 because the weather was so bad she was not able to open her lower gun ports during the battle.) In the 1750s the cruising role of the 44-gun two deck ship was taken over by new 32- and 36-gun frigates, leaving the type almost completely obsolete.

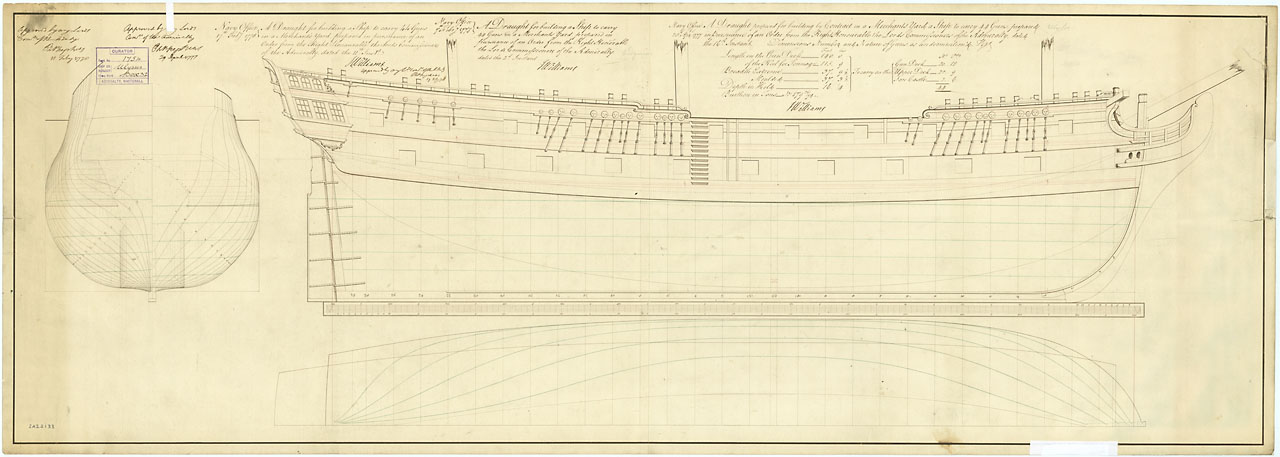
Plan of the Roebuck-class ships

When the American Revolutionary War began in 1775 a need was found for heavily armed ships that could fight in the shallow coastal waters of North America, where two-decked third-rates could not safely sail, and so the Roebuck class of nineteen ships, alongside the similar Adventure class, was ordered to the specifications of the original ships to fill this need. The frigate classes that had overtaken the 44-gun ship as the preferred design for cruisers were at this point still mostly armed with 9- and 12-pounder guns, and it was expected that the class's heavier 18-pounders would provide them with an advantage over these vessels. Frigates with larger armaments would go on to be built by the Royal Navy later on in the American Revolutionary War, but these ships were highly expensive and so Actaeon and her brethren continued to be built as a cheaper alternative.

== Construction ==
Actaeon, as the third ship built to the design, closely followed the parameters as originally set out for Roebuck in 1769. Later ships of the class differed from the original design. While Actaeon and the other early ships of the class had two levels of stern windows, there was only ever one level of cabins behind them.

All but one ship of the class were contracted out to civilian dockyards for construction, and the contract for Actaeon was given to Randall & Co at Rotherhithe. The ship was ordered on 3 July 1776, laid down in July the same year and launched on 29 January 1778 with the following dimensions: 140 feet 1 1/2 inches (42.7 m) along the gun deck, 115 feet 10 1/2 inches (35.3 m) at the keel, with a beam of 37 feet 11 3/4 inches (11.6 m) and a depth in the hold of 16 feet 4 inches (5 m). Her draught, which made the class so valued in the American Revolutionary War, was 9 feet 8 inches (2.9 m) forward and 14 feet 6 inches (4.4 m) aft. She measured 887 8/94 tons burthen. The fitting out process for Actaeon was completed on 17 April at Deptford Dockyard. Her construction and fitting out cost in total £17,940.

Actaeon received an armament of twenty 18-pounder long guns on her lower deck, with twenty-two 9-pounders on the upper deck. These were complemented by two 6-pounders on the forecastle; the quarterdeck was unarmed. The ship was to have a crew of 280 men, which was increased to 300 in 1783. She was named on 27 August 1776 after the mythological Greek huntsman Actaeon.

== Service ==
=== American Revolutionary War ===
Actaeon was commissioned by Captain Philip Boteler in January 1778 for service in the North Sea. Boteler was then in August given command of a squadron for the defence of the Channel Islands, comprising Actaeon, a fourth-rate, three frigates, two sloops, and two cutters. In the following year Captain Robert Keeler took command of the ship and on 7 March Actaeon sailed to join the Jamaica Station. During this transition Actaeon formed part of a force commanded by Rear-Admiral Sir Edward Hughes that sailed to Goree on 8 May and found that the French garrison had deserted the island, leaving it for the British to peacefully occupy. Hughes continued on to the East Indies Station while Actaeon travelled to Jamaica. On 24 October Actaeon was one of several ships to chase the French 26-gun frigate Alcmène off Martinique; she eventually surrendered to the 28-gun frigate HMS Proserpine, which together with Actaeon brought the captured frigate to Carlisle Bay, Barbados.

Continuing in the West Indies, under the orders of Rear-Admiral Hyde Parker, on 23 March 1780 Actaeon was sent from Gros Islet, Saint Lucia, to convey soldiers back to their garrisons in the Leeward Islands. She afterwards returned to Saint Lucia, where she was left when the rest of Parker's fleet moved on in April, to defend the island alongside the 50-gun fourth-rate HMS Preston. On 26 April Actaeon was sent to Tobago where she was to anchor in a bay and assist the authorities ashore with defending against any attack on the island.

Actaeon left the West Indies in June as part of a convoy, escorting merchant ships to Britain. She carried on board all the invalids from Saint Lucia, including Captain Timothy Edwards whose ship, the 74-gun ship of the line HMS Cornwall, had sunk at Saint Lucia, succumbing to damage received at the Battle of Martinique. Edwards died of a fever on 12 July during the passage home. Having reached Chatham Dockyard on 13 September Actaeon was paid off, being refitted there from October. Recommissioned by Captain Francis Parry in November, work on Actaeon was completed in January 1781 having cost £5,827. This included the addition of copper sheathing. On 13 March the ship again travelled to serve at Jamaica, escorting a convoy there. Patrolling off Cape Francais on 3 June 1782, Actaeon was witness to a French convoy escorted by eight ships of the line sailing for Europe. She reported the sighting to Rear-Admiral Sir Samuel Hood, but the convoy was not caught.

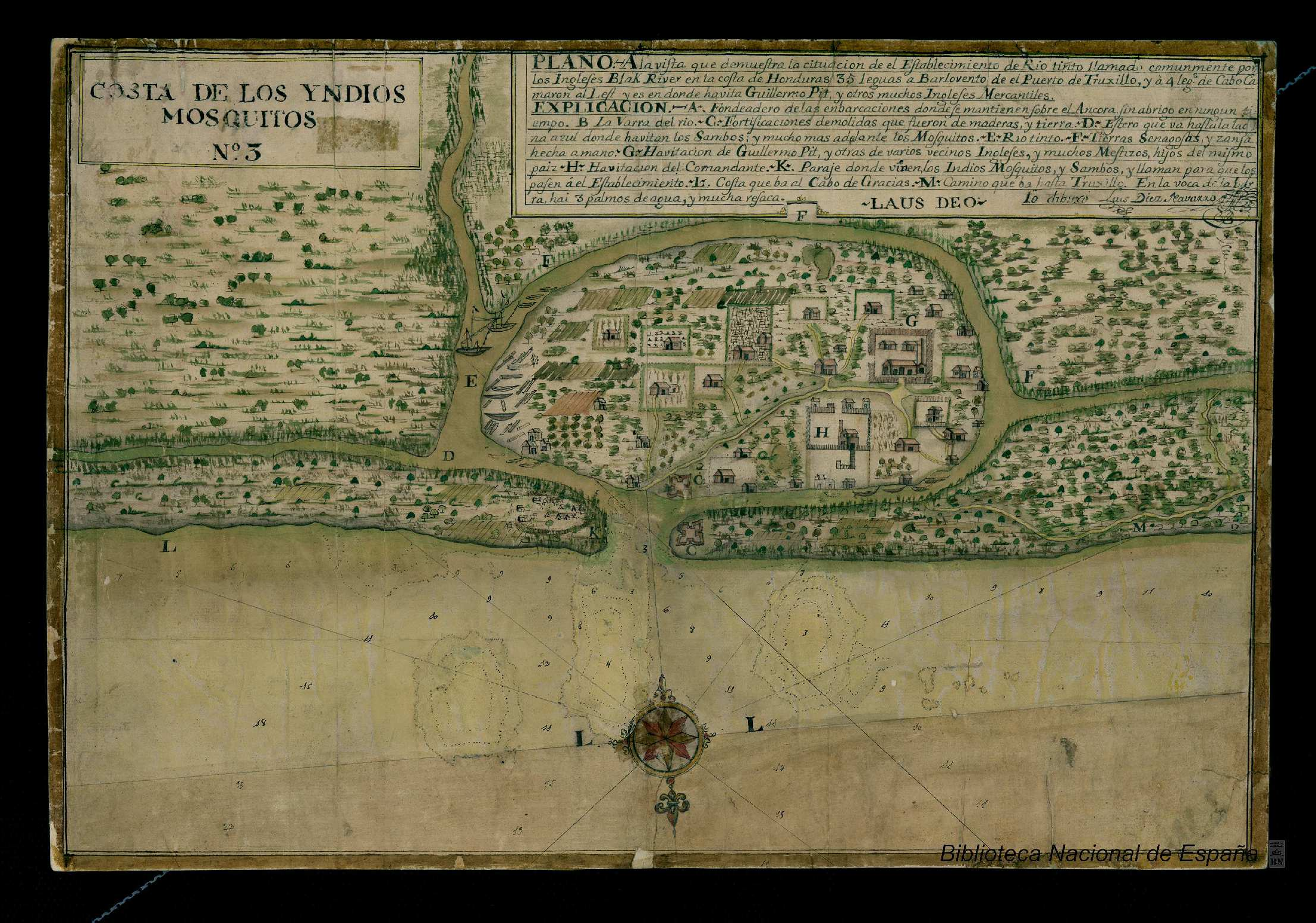
Black River settlement depicted in 1765

Parry was subsequently given command of a squadron of seven ships, with himself as commodore. On 31 March a Spanish attack had captured the British Black River settlement on the Mosquito Coast, and Parry was to assist Lieutenant-Colonel Edward Despard in recapturing it. The ships reinforced him with weapons, ammunition, and 130 Loyal American Rangers for the Battle of the Black River. Despard formed his 1,180-strong force together at Cabo Gracias a Dios on 28 August, and on 30 August marched out to Black River. There, after discussion, the Spanish garrison of 742 men agreed to surrender, fearing that they would otherwise be massacred by the native troops. The day after the surrender Parry's squadron captured a Spanish 16-gun polacre that had been sailing to reinforce Black River with another 100 soldiers. Actaeon and the squadron returned to Jamaica on 4 October alongside the expedition's transport ships and two captured vessels.

Hood received word in December that three separate Franco-Spanish squadrons were attempting to reach Cape Francais, and he sent ships under his command out to find and intercept them. On 9 December Actaeon was sent to patrol between Mayaguana and Caicos, searching for the squadrons coming from Havana and Boston. On 9 January 1783 Parry saw what he believed to be an enemy fleet of fifteen ships sailing towards Caicos, and reported this to Hood. The British went out in search of the fleet on 12 January but found no enemies, with Hood concluding that Parry had in fact seen a convoy of British transports sailing to Jamaica. This led Hood to question Parry's judgement, he having previously been thought a solid and judicious officer. With the American Revolutionary War ending later in the year Actaeon was sent back to Britain and paid off.

=== Inter-war period ===
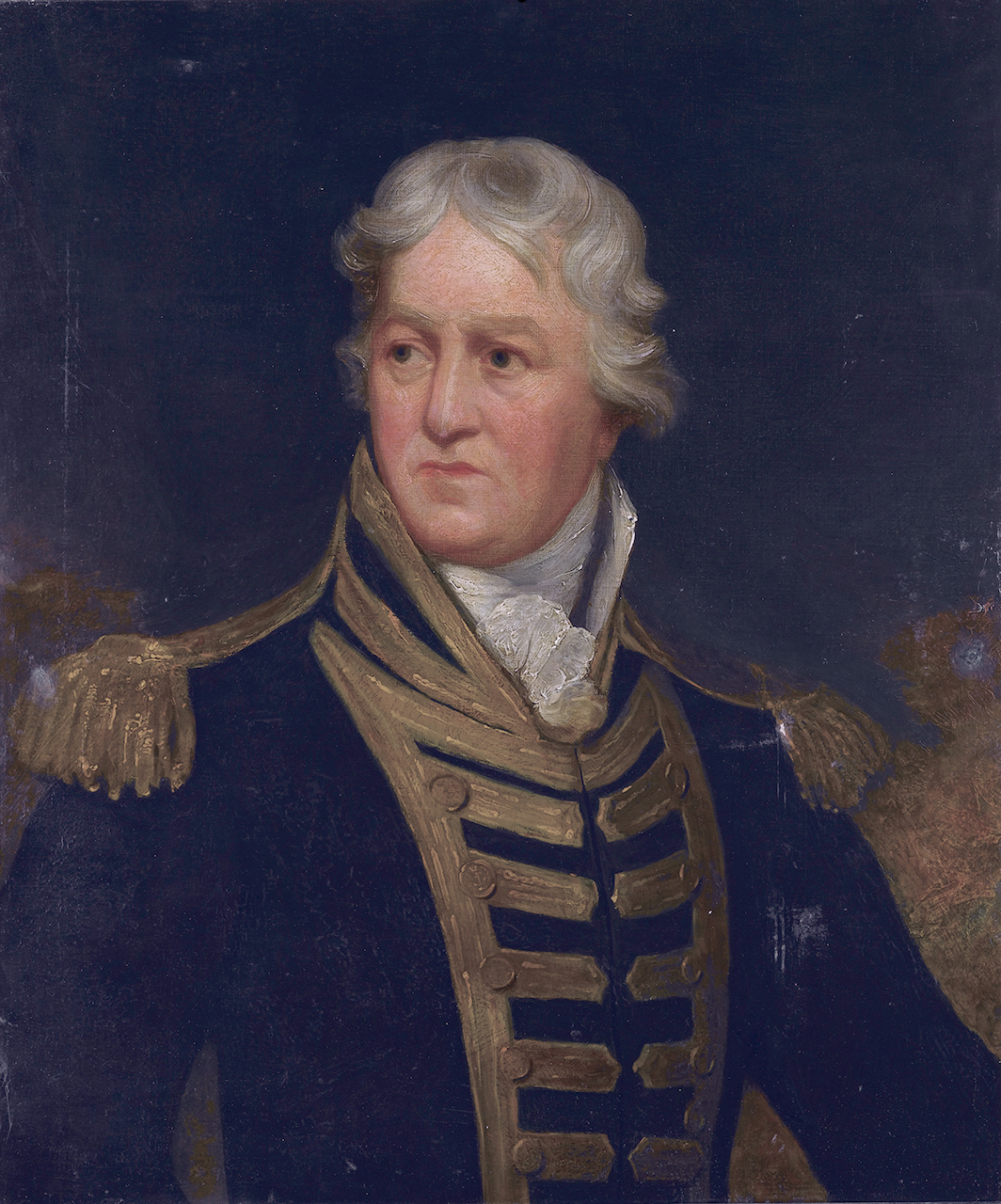
Sir Charles Middleton converted the Roebuck class into troop ships

With the wartime necessity of using the obsolete ships as frontline warships now at an end, most ships of Actaeon's type were taken out of service. While lacking modern fighting capabilities, the design still provided a fast ship, and so the Comptroller of the Navy, Sir Charles Middleton, pressed them into service as troop ships. During a long-term period of repair at Portsmouth Dockyard, lasting between 1783 and December 1787 and costing £6,720, Actaeon was converted to this role. Having been recommissioned in October by Lieutenant Henry Blaxton, she served as such until being paid off again in February the following year.

Actaeon underwent another refit at Portsmouth in September, being fitted for "foreign service" at a cost of £1,594 and in the following month recommissioned under Lieutenant Joseph Hanwell. Still a troop ship, she was armed en flute and employed in taking soldiers out to various colonies. On 5 May 1790 she sailed from Cork carrying the 62nd Regiment of Foot to Halifax, Nova Scotia. With the Spanish Armament having begun and war being a possibility, upon arriving there her orders were changed and on 4 July she sailed on to Jamaica with the regiment. Actaeon then escorted a convoy of merchant ships back to Britain.

Having arrived back in Britain, a scare started that Spithead was going to be attacked by a fireship. On 29 September Actaeon was sent to St Helens on the Isle of Wight with the 10-gun cutter HMS Swan to search vessels accessing the port in order to find any fireships. They finished this task on 3 October. Actaeon was then returned to troop ship duties and Hanwell was promoted to commander on 21 October. Actaeon was anchored in Cawsand Bay on 5 January 1791 when she was caught up in a large storm, being dragged two miles and almost wrecked on Penlee Point before her anchors caught on some rough terrain, saving her. She was paid off on 13 May.

=== French Revolutionary Wars ===
After a period of inactivity Actaeon was brought back into service for the French Revolutionary Wars, being fitted as a receiving ship between April and July 1795, costing a further £5,185. The ship was sent to serve at Liverpool, having been recommissioned in May by Commander Azariah Uzuld. Designated as a guard ship, Actaeon was positioned in the River Mersey and also for a time off Guernsey. Actaeon was still at Liverpool in March 1799 when Uzuld died, being replaced in command by Commander Philip Hue in April.

Under Hue the ship formed part of the Impress Service. The biographer William O'Byrne recounts one occasion in which four men from Actaeon singlehandedly pressed a ship with 200 sailors on board, successfully taking seventeen of them and forcing a further thirty to jump overboard to escape them. As part of his duties as commanding naval officer at Liverpool, Hue seized the Russian ship Angalo on 30 December 1800 and had marines from Actaeon arrest her crew; he then took eight Danish and Swedish ships on 21 January 1801. Hue stayed with the ship until later in the year, and on 30 April 1802 Actaeon was sold to be broken up.
