= Enrique MacDonnell =

Spanish army and navy officer (c. 1752–1823)

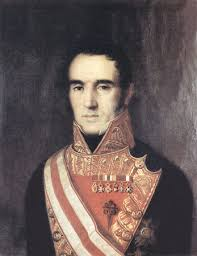
- Portrait of Enrique MacDonnell
- Born: c. 1752; Ireland or Pontevedra, Spain
- Died: 23 November 1823; Cádiz, Spain
- Military career
- Allegiance: Spanish Empire; Sweden
- Branch: Spanish Army; Spanish Navy
- Service years: 1776–1823
- Rank: Vice-Admiral
- Commands: Santa Ana, Andaluz, Diligencia, Santo Domingo, Oden, San Felipe Apolstol. Astudo, Gallardo, SanCarlos, San Nicholas de Bari, Rayo
- Conflicts: American Revolutionary War; Siege of Pensacola; Battle of Roatan; Russo-Swedish War; Battle of Svensksund; War of the First Coalition; Capture of San Pietro and Sant'Antioco; Napoleonic Wars; Battle of Trafalgar

Enrique MacDonnell y de Gonde (c. 1752–1823) was a Spanish Navy officer known for his participation in several sea battles, including the Battle of Trafalgar.

He was born either in Ireland or in Pontevedra, Spain into a prominent Irish-Spanish family, though his naval records state his origin as Irish. His father was a Spanish Army brigadier-general and colonel of the Irish Regiment of Irlanda, and his mother a lady-in-waiting to the royal household.

== Spelling of surname ==
Although his surname is often spelt MacDonell, it is signed as MacDonnell in his letters and reports to the admiralty, and appears as such in his biography at Spain's Royal Academy of History.

== Irish family origins ==
In the Central Archive of the Spanish Armada, he is listed as an Irish citizen. Few details exist of his youth, but his family had Irish origins and kept strong Irish connections. His grandfather was born in Dublin, and his grandmother was from Cork; they fled to Spain to escape the religious persecution in Ireland.

== Army career ==
His immediate family included several officers in the Spanish Army, and following that tradition, he entered his father's regiment, one of the Irish regiments of Spain's army, in 1760, aged seven. In 1764, he transferred to another Irish regiment, Regimento de Infantería de Ultonia, and was promoted to second lieutenant. MacDonnell was promoted to infantry lieutenant in 1769 and then to the rank of captain in 1774, before requesting a transfer to the Spanish Navy. In 1775, he was named a Knight of the Order of Santiago.

== Early naval career ==
MacDonnell had a notable naval career, serving in several major engagements, including the battles of Roatán and Trafalgar. He was injured on several occasions but progressed through the ranks from Sub-Lieutenant to Vice-Admiral.

In July 1776, he joined the Spanish Navy as a sub-lieutenant and was assigned to the frigate Gaviota as part of a mission against the Algerians in the squadron of Captain Felix de Tejada. In September, he was transferred within the squadron to the 34-gun frigate Nuestra Señora del Carmén. In November, Nuestra Señora del Carmen and her accompanying ships fought and burned two Algerian xebecs in Melilla Cove.

On 28 February 1777, he was promoted to lieutenant, and in April, his next posting was as lieutenant in command of the xebec Pilar, initially bound for Corsica. He later served in the West Indies. During this time, he was injured in a battle with a larger British ship before returning to Cádiz. MacDonnell was briefly assigned to the ships San Isidro and Andoluz in December 1778.

In February 1779, upon recovery from his injuries, he was posted to the 34-gun frigate Santa Maria Magdalena. It was part of a six-ship squadron patrolling the Azores searching for a British squadron of 4–5 ships traveling from South America. The Spanish never made this interception, but on 11 September the squadron spotted a lone British ship off Terceira Island in the Azores. Santa Maria Magdalena and another frigate gave chase, but the British ship escaped as nightfall arrived. The frigates became separated from the fleet and sailed back towards Spain alone. On 15 August 1779, Santa Maria Magdalena captured the British 10-gun privateer Duke Of Cornwall off Cape St Vincent by disguising herself as a merchant ship. The privateer surrendered after the first Spanish warning salvo.

MacDonnell was on board the 30-gun ship Andaluz as part of a convoy to Havana led by Don Jose De Solano transporting troops from the Regimento de Infantería de Hibernia to Cuba, arriving in August 1780.

In April 1781, he boarded the 74-gun ship San Gabriel, and participated in the Siege of Pensacola, where he went ashore with a detachment of marines and was wounded in action. Once recovered, on 4 August he was promoted and he received the command of the sloop Santa Ana, with the rank of commander (captain de frigata).

MacDonnell was one of the commanding officers in the March 1782 Battle of Roatán. He is recorded in Spanish Naval Gazettes as being in command of one of the frigates. Elsewhere, his role has been described as a dual role, as the second-in-command on the 40-gun Santa Matilde but also as captain of one of the accompanying frigates. When the British defenders refused to surrender, MacDonnell who spoke fluent English and French was chosen to row ashore to offer terms of surrender. They were rejected. The Spanish stormed the island and took control after a short but fierce battle. The defenders surrendered on 17 March and 81 soldiers were taken on board the Spanish ships as prisoners. On 26 May, he took command of the sloop Santa Ana and transferred 400 soldiers from Trujillo, Colón, to the River Tinto in Honduras and other British settlements along that coast. This helped to take possession of them. He left Santa Ana and returned to Trujillo and was back on Santa Matilde. He moved to Havana and he took command of the Andaluz and was promoted to full captain on 23 June 1782.

In February 1783, he took command of the corvette Diligencia. On 25 November, it left Havana en route to Spain. On 4 December, it engaged in a fierce battle against a heavier-armed British privateer north of Bermuda, sinking it. Diligencia travelled onwards to Cádiz, Spain.

He was in the admiralty in Madrid for first nine months of 1784 before taking brief command of the 74-gun Santo Domingo and sailing it to Ferrol to be decommissioned.

MacDonnell returned to Cádiz in July 1787 and was appointed to the position of port captain in autumn of that year briefly and reappointed from May 1788 to March 1789. Whilst based in Cádiz he applied to join for the Swedish Navy after securing permission to do so from the Spanish Navy.

== Swedish Navy and return to Spain ==
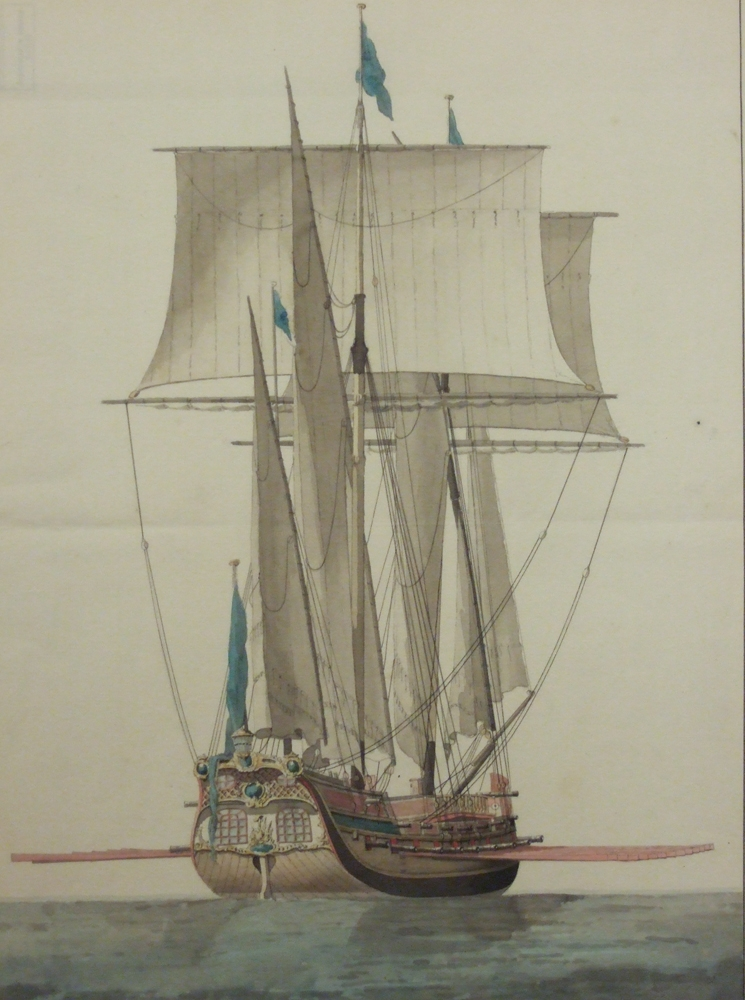
Color drawing of hemmema Oden

During the summer of 1789 MacDonnell joined the Swedish Navy to take part in the Russo-Swedish War and was assigned command of the hemmema Oden with Måns von Rosenstein. During the 1789 Battle of Svensksund he had a ten-and-a-half-hour cannonade battle with several Russian ships. MacDonnell eventually surrendered after becoming surrounded by seven ships. Having already lost one-third of his crew and with only four cannons still operating, he was badly injured himself. He was taken as a prisoner of war in St Petersburg. Upon his release he was awarded military honours by Gustav III of Sweden. He was reportedly offered the supreme command of the entire Swedish Navy with 35 ships and 20,000 sailors. He declined the position as a condition of his early release from Russia was that he would not go to war with Russia again. Correspondence with the King of Spain approved his decision to decline the offer. He did remain as a naval advisor to the king sitting on his war council.

In July 1791, he returned to Spain, taking command of the 68/64-gun San Felipe Apostol conducting operations off the coast of Morocco until December.

MacDonnell was captain of the 60-gun Astuto from 5 May to 31 August 1793 and sailed with a fleet of 24 ships under the command of Don Francisco De Borja, in the Campaign of Sardinia. The fleet succeeded in the Capture of San Pietro and Sant'Antioco islands. Heavily outnumbered, the French garrison of 800 men and 400 sailors surrendered without a battle, and the 36-gun frigate Hélène was captured. From August 1793 until January 1794, he was captain of the 74-gun Gallardo, with Admiral De Borja's fleet.

On 25 January 1794, he was promoted to commodore. In August 1794, he was commodore of the 94-gun San Carlos. Sailing from Cádiz it travelled to Havana and the Sea of the Antilles in the squadron of Amistizabal before leaving Havana in February 1795 with the ship Europa and both returning to Cádiz arriving in April 1795 laden with money, gold and goods.

In May 1795 he was commodore aboard the 80-gun San Nicholas de Bari. It was a short command and in February 1796 he passed command of San Nicholas de Bari to Commordore Tomas Geraldino, who later died on board during a battle with Horatio Nelson's ship HMS Captain in the 1797 Battle of Cape St. Vincent. Geraldino and MacDonnell were his colleagues while living in Cádiz.

He changed ship to Angel de la Guarda and returned to Havana. During this time, he was brought before his superiors following a dispute with a lieutenant, Fernando Morillo. The case was dismissed and he once again returned to Spain in 1799. That year he was made a Commander de Palmoas en la Order Santiago.

== Retirement and return ==
In 1800, MacDonnell was in Spain and the following year, he retired from the navy with the honorary use of his uniform and rank.

He wrote the Coordinated offensive plan of land and sea against the United States of America in 1804. It was submitted to Minister Dom Grandallana, returned apparently unread or uncommented upon. The plan submitted to the Spanish Admiralty for a full-scale war and invasion of the United States, involving naval and ground battles. Spain was becoming increasingly concerned at the growth of American power. The Third Coalition and the 1808 French destruction of the Spanish naval fleet saw this plan withdrawn.

In 1805 MacDonnell came out of retirement and rejoined the navy and fought at the Battle of Trafalgar commanding the 100-gun Rayo. After the battle, he led a sortie alongside Julien Cosmao to try and recapture Spanish and French ships captured during the battle. They managed to recapture two prizes that had been abandoned by the British, but lost three ships of the line (including Rayo) and one recaptured prize in the storm that followed the battle. Three more prizes rose up against their prize crews and tried to sail back to Spain, though only one managed to do so. The sortie also captured 150 members of British prize crews, which resulted in a prisoner exchange between the Spanish and French and the British several days later. He was promoted to rear-admiral the following fortnight on 8 November.

=== Battle of Trafalgar ===
In 1804, Federico Gravina was short of senior officers and MacDonnell volunteered to come out of retirement. Both men wrote to the Spanish admiralty at the same time seeking his reappointment. MacDonnell offered to take any rank the navy considered suitable but he was reinstated as commodore. Gravina appointed him commodore of Rayo.

Before the battle itself, a war council meeting of the fourteen leading Franco-Spanish admirals and commodores was held on Pierre-Charles Villeneuve's ship in Cádiz's port. MacDonnell, a French speaker, was chosen as one of the seven senior Spanish naval officers on the Spanish side. It was a meeting that got very argumentative with raised voices.

Despite Spanish warnings, Villeneuve in command of the combined fleet, decided to put to sea on 21 October. On leaving port the fleet encountered Nelson's fleet which attacked and began the Battle of Trafalgar. At the battle Rayo was positioned in the rearguard. Due to the weak wind conditions Rayo initially found it difficult to turn and join the battle. Later MacDonnell ignored the orders of the French commodore in charge of the rearguard and was one of only two ships from the rearguard that turned back to join the centre of battle.

Rayo had four deaths during the battle and its mast was seriously damaged. After the battle at sunset Rayo escaped capture and MacDonnell was the highest-ranking Spanish officer to escape the battle uninjured and return to Cádiz.

=== Post-Trafalgar sortie ===
On 22 October, the day after the battle, a meeting of the council of war of senior naval officers was held in Cádiz, where the surviving ships had harbored. At this meeting plans were made on the Spanish flagship Principe de Asturias by Admiral Antonio de Escaño who reasoned that the British would find it hard to hold onto their prizes due to the stormy weather. He ordered a sortie to recapture these ships which had thousands of Spanish and French prisoners on board. As the only senior officer remaining, MacDonnell was given command of the squadron chosen for this task along with French commodore Julien Cosmao.

The following morning on 23 October, at 9:30am the sortie began and five ships of the line (Pluton, Indomptable, Neptune, Rayo and San Francisco de Asis), alongside five frigates and two brigs (Cornélie, Thémis, Hortense, Rhin, Hermione, Furet and Argus), set out to sea. This mission was to have the appearance of a surprise counter-attack, but the recovery of British prizes was the objective. The orders were to only engage in battle with ships of similar size if challenged and conditions favored. In response, the British ships at the end of their fleet cast off four prizes and formed a defensive line. The Franco-Spanish squadron took control of two prizes which had been cast off, Santa Ana and Neptuno, and towed them to Cádiz, while prisoners on three other prizes, Bucentaure, Algésiras and Monarca took back control from their prize crews and tried to sail back to Spain; Bucentaure was later wrecked on rocks, with the crew rescued by Indomptable, though she sank in the post-battle storm, killing 1,100 people on board. The storm also wrecked San Francisco de Asis and Neptuno.

The following day, Rayo was crippled and was captured by HMS Donegal. However, she foundered shortly after a British prize crew from Donegal took command; MacDonnell had been previously taken as a prisoner of war aboard Donegal. Meanwhile, Monarca was recaptured by the British but was abandoned and eventually sunk. The crew of Rayo was rescued by small boats from Cádiz and the prize crew was taken prisoner. Santa Ana, with Vice-Admiral Ignacio Álava onboard, reached Cádiz safely, while the crews of San Francisco de Asis and Neptuno were also rescued. Ultimately, the Franco-Spanish sortie achieved little, having returned to Cádiz with fewer ships than they left with, though it did result in the British scuttling five of their nine remaining prizes; of the five French and Spanish ships that were retaken from their prize crews, only Santa Ana and Algésiras made it back to Cádiz. MacDonnell, who was on board Donegal, was released in a prisoner exchange a week after the battle. Prisoners on both sides, especially officers, were treated very humanely. MacDonnell was able to write a full report to Admiral Gravina while on board Donegal indicating he was afforded cordial treatment and facilities.

=== Captured by HMS Donegal ===
At the time Rayo was captured on 25 October, all three of its masts were broken and it was unable to put up a defensive fight. MacDonnell lowered the Spanish flag to surrender after the first cannon shot and then threw the ship's secret signals book overboard tied to a cannonball. A prize crew from HMS Donegal, including its master, took control of the nearly crippled Rayo, and MacDonnell was taken prisoner on board Donegal. It coincidentally was the French frigate that Irish revolutionary Wolfe Tone was captured on off the coast of Ireland, having been renamed. Despite the efforts of the British prize crew, Rayo foundered on the rocks in the storm with the loss of 25 lives. The remaining crew of Rayo and the 25-strong British prize crew on board were rescued by small Spanish boats. The master of HMS Donegal recounted an unexpected kindness when he was not allowed to disembark from the small boat in Cádiz until a small cart was reversed into the water, to ensure he could step onto it and thence ashore, so not to get wet. MacDonnell was equally well treated while on board Donegal, and he was released after a week on board. While on that ship he wrote his report to the admiralty. After a week, Captain Henry Blackwood came ashore at Cádiz and both sides exchanged prisoners.

== War with France and British alliance ==
After the Spanish insurrection of Seville in 1808, and the beginning of Peninsular War, the Spanish junta in Cádiz rose up against the French. He was appointed by the Supreme Junta of the city as commander of the Spanish fleet. His first task was to sail out to the British fleet under Admiral Collingwood to declare they were about to attack the French and to seek an alliance with Britain. He refused Collingwood's offer of assistance as this would have meant a sharing of the captured French ships after the attack that became known as the Capture of the Rosily Squadron. On his return he had orders to attack the French fleet in the port, assisting the land-based artillery, with five days hostilities ongoing the Spanish refused the British offer of assistance as they watched from sea. The French surrendered. After taking the French ships, he boarded the flagship of British admiral John Child Purvis, general commander of the squadron that blockaded the city, trying to cease hostilities between Spain and Great Britain. The matter was satisfactorily resolved, with Collingwood also coming ashore to negotiate a new Anglo-Spanish alliance. In this he was so successful that the British general Sir John Moore, offered to support MacDonnell's appointment as the Junta's ambassador in London; but MacDonnell refused saying, "to have accepted a diplomatic post when there was a general call to arms in my country, would not have been in keeping with the dignity and character of a high-ranking officer."

MacDonnell was admitted to the military hospital in Cádiz from June 1815 to June 1816. In 1817 he was promoted to vice-admiral and appointed a Minister of the Supreme Council of the Admiralty. Vice-Admiral Álava, who he helped rescue at Trafalgar, had also just been made an admiral at the Admiralty at that time. The following year, the Supreme Council was abolished.

In 1820 MacDonnell subdued a mutiny in Cádiz.

== Illness and death ==
He returned to Cádiz, where he had to return to enter the hospital there due to illness. He died there on 23 November 1823. His funeral was paid by public subscription indicating a lack of personal funds.

== Popular culture ==
- Rayo was featured on a Cuba stamp in 1989.
- The remains of Rayo were located in 2003 by a team from the University of Huelva, 300 metres (980 ft) from shore and in waters 7 metres (23 ft) deep. Little remains today because the deposit was plundered several times historically.
