= Convention of London (1786) =

British-Spanish treaty about British Honduras and Mosquitia

The Convention of London (Spanish: Convención de Londres), also known as the Anglo-Spanish Convention, was an agreement negotiated between the Kingdom of Great Britain and the Kingdom of Spain concerning the status of British settlements in Mosquitia and the Bay of Honduras. It was signed on 14 July 1786.

According to the terms of the 1783 Spanish Treaty of Versailles that ended the Anglo-Spanish War, British settlements on the "Spanish Continent" were to be evacuated, using language that was similar to that in the 1763 Treaty of Paris that ended the Seven Years' War. British settlers in the area resisted implementation of the 1783 agreement, observing (as they had after the 1763 treaty) that the Spanish had never actually controlled the area, and that it therefore did not belong to the "Spanish Continent" but the "American Continent". After both sides increased military activities in the area of the Black River Settlement, where most of the British settlers lived, it was decided to engage in further negotiations to resolve the issue.

In the agreement signed 14 July 1786, Britain agreed to evacuate all British settlements from the "Country of the Mosquitos". In exchange, Spain agreed to expand the territory available to British loggers on the Yucatan Peninsula, and allowed them to cut mahogany and other hardwoods that were increasing in value. Over the opposition of the Mosquito Coast settlers, the agreement was implemented, and the British evacuated more than 2,000 people. Most of them went to Belize, but others were relocated to Jamaica, Grand Cayman, or Roatán. Control of Black River was formally turned over to the Spanish on 29 August 1787, by William Pitt Lawrie, the grandson of its founder, William Pitt (1699-1771).

== See also ==
- List of treaties
