= Jaume Vallcorba Plana =

Spanish philologist

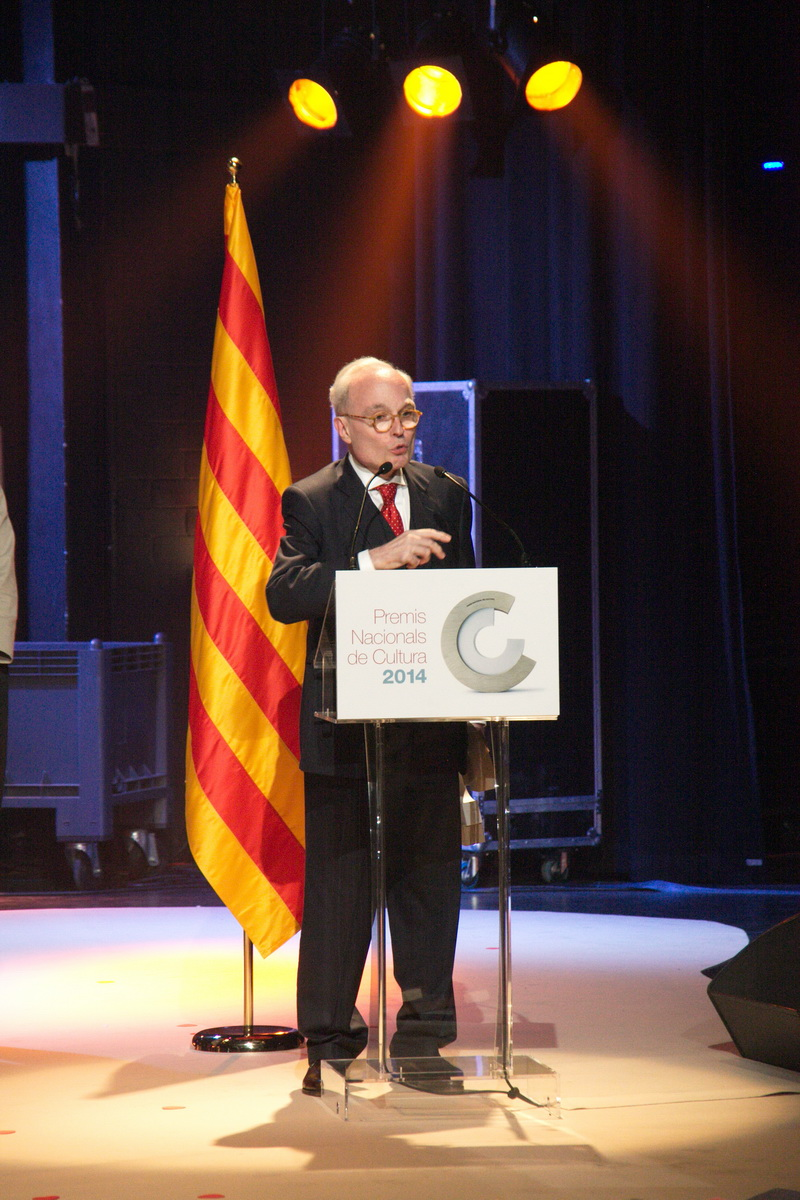
Jaume Vallcorba Plana at the delivery of the National Culture Awards of Catalonia 2014. Santa Coloma de Gramenet, June 2, 2014

Jaume (or Santiago) Vallcorba Plana (21 September 1949 – 23 August 2014) was a Spanish philologist and publisher.

== Life and career ==
Born in Tarragona, Catalonia, he completed an Arts degree at the Autonomous University of Barcelona and obtained a PhD at the University of Barcelona with a thesis on Josep Maria Junoy and the early European avant-garde movements. He was a lecturer and professor in Literature at the University of Bordeaux, the University of Lleida, the University of Barcelona and the Pompeu Fabra University (Barcelona) but he left university teaching in 2004.

He was a permanent member of the Royal Academy of Doctors of Catalonia and a scholar of medieval aesthetics and literature. He founded the publishing houses Quaderns Crema in 1979 and Editorial Acantilado in 1999 and has been director of both since their inception. He is recognised for his contribution of offering a new perspective on the early-twentieth-century avant-garde movements. Through his publishing house, he published Catalan authors, including Quim Monzó, Sergi Pàmies and Empar Moliner. His catalogue included new Spanish editions of authors such as Chateaubriand, James Boswell and Montaigne, along with a considerable number of European authors, from Pessoa, to Imre Kertész, Stefan Zweig and Joseph Roth. He has introduced to Spanish readers translations of a considerable number of contemporary Central European writers as well as works by newer Spanish writers.

He published numerous studies on aesthetics and literature and was directly commissioned by the poet J. V. Foix to publish his poetic oeuvre. He also published Junoy’s poetry.

He died on 23 August 2014, at the age of 64.

== Prizes ==
Among the prizes and awards Jaume Vallcorba Plana has received are the following:

- FAD (Promotion of the Decorative Arts) Gold Medal (2001)
- National Prize for Best Individual Contribution to Publishing, 2002
- City Council of Barcelona Gold Medal for Cultural Merit (2004)
- Grand Order of Merit for Cultural Contribution, conceded by the Republic of Poland (2005)
- Publishing Merit Award at the Guadalajara International Book Fair (2010)
- Nominee to International Zbigniew Herbert Award First Edition, Poland, 2013
- National Prize of Culture, conceded by the Government of Catalonia (2014)

== Bibliography ==
- Por orden alfabético. Escritores, editores, amigos, Jorge Herralde (Barcelona, Anagrama, 2006).
- Entre paréntesis: ensayos, artículos y discursos, Roberto Bolaño (Barcelona, Anagrama, 2004).
- Marilyn McCully, Noucentisme: Picasso, Junoy und der Klassizismus von Barcelona, in Ulrich Weisner (herausgegeben von), Picassos Klassizismus, Stuttgart, Cantz, 1988, p. 43–51.
- Aurelio González, review his Lectura de la Chanson de Roland, in Medievalia, 4, 1989, p. 6.
- Robert S. Lubar, Cubism, Classicism and Ideology: The 1912 Exposició d'art cubista in Barcelona and French Cubist Criticism, in Elizabeth Cowling and Jennifer Mundy, On Classic Ground, London, Tate Gallery, 1990, p. 309–324. Based on his J. M. Junoy, Obra poética.
- Friedrich Wolfzettel, reviews his Lectura de la Chanson de Roland, in Zeitschrift für romanische Philologie, n# 108 (Heft 3/4), 1992, p. 348–351.
- Quinze ans de l'édition en Barcelone, doctoral thesis read about his editorial activity at the Grenoble University on December 9, 1995 by the professor Edmond Raillard under the direction of professor Michel Moner.
- Arthur Terry, reviews his Noucentisme, Mediterraneisme i Classicisme: apunts per a la història d'una estètica, in Journal of Hispanic Studies, 3 (1994–1995) p. 488–490.
- Juan Manuel Bonet, Diccionario de las vanguardias en España 1907–1936, Madrid, Alianza Editorial, 1995, with multiple references.
- Reviews his Noucentisme, Mediterraneisme i Classicisme: apunts per a la història d'una estètica, by Neus Torres, in Revista de Catalunya, n# 107, May 1996, p. 126–127.
- Reviews his Noucentisme, Mediterraneisme i Classicisme: apunts per a la història d'una estètica, by Nil Santiáñez-Tió, in España Contemporánea, volume IX, n# 2, autumn 1996, p. 114–117.
- Reviews his Noucentisme, Mediterraneisme i Classicisme: apunts per a la història d'una estètica, by Joan Ramon Resina, Hispanic Review, summer 1996.
- Reviews his editions of Darrer comunicat and Tocant a mà, from J. V. Foix, by Arthur Terry, in Bulletin of Hispanic Studies, LXXIII (1996), p. 455.
