= Battle of the Black River =

1782 battle in the American Revolutionary War

- Part of the American Revolutionary War
- Portrait of Colonel Edward Marcus Despard
Date	13 April – 23 August 1782
Location	Black River settlement on the Mosquito Coast 15.9462°N 84.9299°W
Result	British victory

Belligerents
Spain	Great Britain

Commanders and leaders
(Spain) Matías de Gálvez (Spain) Don Tomás Julia	(Kingdom of Great Britain) Edward Despard (Kingdom of Great Britain) James Lawrie

Strength
1,400 regulars, marines and sailors	1,180+ regulars, militia & Miskitos; 12 ships

Casualties and losses
60 killed 100 wounded 750 captured 400 due to disease, 1 ship captured	Approx. 50 casualties unknown losses due to disease

The Battle of the Black River was a series of conflicts between April and August 1782 during the American War of Independence. They were fought between British and Spanish forces for control of the Black River settlement, located on the Mosquito Shore. Spanish forces forced out a small British garrison and most of the settlers in April 1782. The British responded in August, regrouping the settlers and reinforcing them with troops from Jamaica. They successfully recaptured the settlement from the disease-depleted Spanish force.

== Background ==
Matías de Gálvez, the Captain General of Spanish Guatemala, was ordered by King Charles to "dislocate the English from their hidden settlements on the Gulf of Honduras". In 1782, he embarked on a series of actions to wipe out British settlements, which held long-established logging rights on the southern coast of the Yucatan Peninsula (present-day Belize), and also settlements on the Mosquito Coast (present-day Honduras and Nicaragua).

In March 1782, more than 800 Spanish troops led by Gálvez had captured Roatán, overwhelming the British garrison that then numbered just eighty men. With reinforcements of another 600 men, he went on to capture the Black River settlement the next month, which was defended by fewer than twenty men. James Lawrie, a major in the 49th Regiment of Foot who commanded the small British force, resisted as best he could, but abandoned the fortifications and fled with his men through the jungle to Cape Gracias a Dios.

The British governor of Jamaica, General Sir Archibald Campbell, was preoccupied by a planned Franco-Spanish attack on the island, and was unable to immediately send relief. However, the invasion of Jamaica was called off after the decisive British victory at the Battle of the Saintes where Admiral Rodney defeated the French fleet before it joined the Spanish. By the end of April the balance of power in the Caribbean had shifted to the British Royal Navy. With this in effect, Governor Campbell gave Edward Marcus Despard permission to retake the Black River settlement after learning that Lawrie had a force waiting to strike back.

== Battle ==
Lawrie was able to regroup a force of about 800 locals (known as the Rattan (Roatan) and Black River Volunteers) and Miskitos in the Cape Gracias a Dios area. These men harassed the Spaniards in guerilla-style warfare. Despard, coming from Jamaica, landed at Cape Gracias a Dios and reached the mouth of the Plantain River with men of the Loyalist company known as the Loyal American Rangers; these eventually met up with Lawrie and his force. Combined with the supporting force that now consisted of 80 Loyalist Americans, 500 settlers (shoremen and freed slaves) and 600 Miskitos, there were 1,200 men in total. A squadron of Royal Navy and armed merchant ships stood by in support. Despard wasted no time in attacking the Spanish to gain the element of surprise.

Meanwhile, the Spanish garrison on Black River had been reduced by disease since its capture in early April. At Quipriva where Fort Dalling was located, a small Spanish contingent of 75 Spaniards was surprised, and all but one were either killed or taken prisoner: a survivor by the name of Manuel Rivas escaped to warn the other soldiers at Caribe.

On 22 August, Despard surrounded Caribe at Black River Bluff opposite the Eastern blockhouse, overwhelming the 140 Spanish soldiers, who surrendered after a short fight. A day after the surrender, a Spanish 16-gun polacre from Trujillo carrying reinforcements of 100 troops and provisions for the Spanish was captured by the small British squadron of ships just off the coast. What was left of the Spanish force from Gálvez's April expedition surrendered by the end of August. Articles of capitulation were proposed by Don Tomás Julia to Despard who accepted.

== Aftermath ==
Lawrie and Despard had thus regained control of Black River, taking more than 27 Spanish officers and 715 rank-and-file as prisoners. Also captured were three colours (which were presented to King George III in November) and 33 cannon. Most of the prisoners in agreements of the terms of surrender were told not to fight under arms again until the end of the war and were promptly sent to Omoa. Lawrie and Despard however decided to stay and defend the territory, fearing a Spanish counterattack.

Juan de Cagigal, Governor of Havana, had learned of the defeat, had fallen into disfavour with Gálvez, and was about to remove him from command altogether. Nevertheless, Gálvez requested reinforcements but none were coming from the governor. However, this time the Spanish with their French allies were on the defensive, their strategy having changed somewhat after the Battle of the Saintes. Paranoia swept through the Spanish command and set back their task of defending Havana and San Juan, Puerto Rico, which took priority over any offensive operations. Further military operations by the Bourbon allies in the Americas were also placed on hold due to the concentration of military operations in Europe (particularly at Gibraltar), and peace talks in Europe were taking place. British forces were able to take advantage of this inaction by recapturing the Bahamas in 1783. Lawrie and Despard held the British settlements in the Mosquito Coast until the end of the war.

For his efforts, Despard was rewarded with the honour of Superintendent of the Bay of Honduras, and for a number of years ruled the territory that became Belize.

== Bibliography ==
- Beatson, Robert. Naval and Military Memoirs of Great Britain, from 1727 to 1783, Vol. I; Vol. III, Appendix, London, 1804.
- Dawson, Frank Griffith (November 1983). "William Pitt's Settlement at Black River on the Mosquito Shore: A Challenge to Spain in Central America, 1732–87". The Hispanic American Historical Review. 63 (4). Duke University Press: 677–706. doi:10.2307/2514901. JSTOR 2514901.
- Chávez, Thomas E (2004). Spain and the Independence of the United States: An Intrinsic Gift. UNM Press. ISBN 978-0-8263-2794-9. OCLC 149117944.
- Jay, Mike (2004). The Unfortunate Colonel Despard. Bantam Press ISBN 0-593-05195-5
- Nichols, John (1782). The Gentleman's Magazine, Volume 52. London.
