= Black River (settlement) =

Former British settlement on the Mosquito Coast

Coordinates: 15.9462°N 84.9299°W

Black River was a British settlement on the Mosquito Coast of present-day Honduras. It was established in 1732 by a British colonist named William Pitt (likely a distant relative of contemporary British politician William Pitt the Elder). The settlement, made on territory claimed but never really controlled by Spain, was evacuated in 1787 pursuant to terms of the Anglo-Spanish Convention of 1786. The Spanish then attempted to colonize the area, but the local Miskitos massacred most of its inhabitants on September 4, 1800. The settlement was abandoned, and its remains can still be seen near the village of Palacios in the Gracias a Dios Department in Honduras.

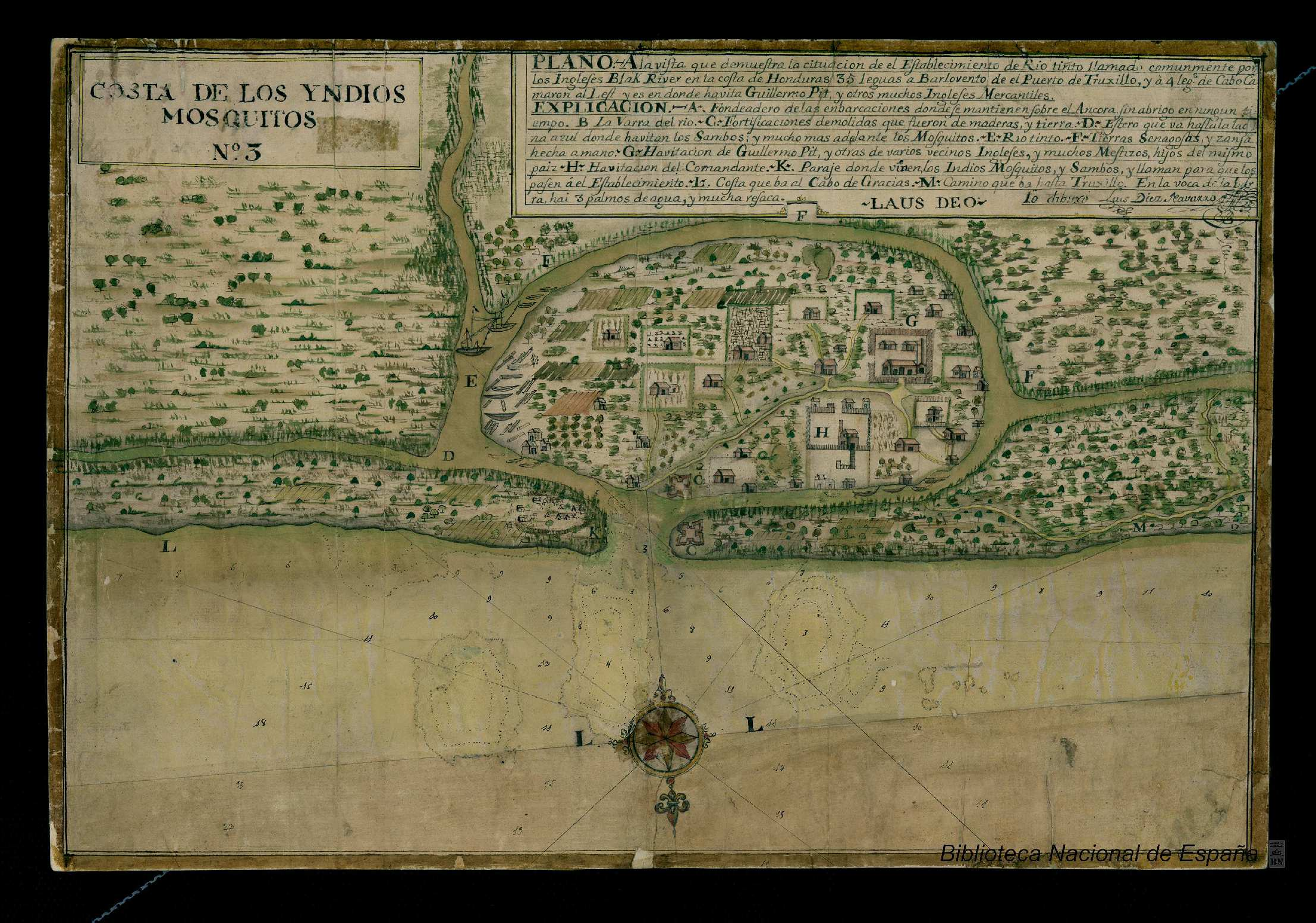
A stylized Spanish map by Luis Diez Navarro from 1765 showing the main British settlement at Black River in Mosquito Coast

== Geography ==
The Mosquito Coast of present-day Honduras and Nicaragua was a tropical tangle of swamps and lagoons in the 18th century, much as it still is today. The area was first explored by Christopher Columbus in 1502. The area where this settlement was established is a lagoon near the mouth of what was then called the Black River, Río Negro, or Río Tinto, but is now known as the Sico River (or Río Sico). The lagoon is in the northwestern corner of the Gracias a Dios Department in Honduras, between the Caratasca Lagoon and the present-day port city of Trujillo, which was then the site of a small Spanish settlement.

At the time of its settlement, the sand bar at the river mouth was sufficiently high to prevent the passage of most ocean-going ships of the time, a feature that significantly aided the settlement's defence and longevity.

== 17th century ==
Early attempts by the Spanish to settle the area were frustrated by the terrain, tropical conditions, lack of valuable resources, and hostile natives, in particular the Miskito. The first British contacts in the area were in 1633 by colonists of the Providence Company who had settled the islands of San Andrés and Providencia. Since they were principally interested in trade with the natives, the Miskitos reacted more favorably to them. On the capture of those islands by the Spanish in 1641, some of the colonists probably fled to the shore and were taken in by the natives. The region was also a stopping point for pirates, and its population became somewhat more mixed when a slave ship foundered in the area, eventually resulting in a mixed-race zambo population.

An informal relationship was established between Miskito rulers and British colonial administrators in Jamaica, in which Miskito leaders traveled to Jamaica or even England to receive education and have their status confirmed. In the late 17th century, British pioneers began logging in the area that is now Belize, to the great annoyance of Spanish authorities, who made numerous largely fruitless attempts to evict British settlers from that area. During the War of the Spanish Succession early in the 18th century, there were reports of British settlers living on the Mosquito Coast.

During the 1720s, the Spanish made numerous attempts to eliminate the British presence on the Belize shore. Many of the settlers retreated, either inland or to the Mosquito Coast, when the Spanish came in force, and generally returned after the Spanish left. In 1732, one of these British loggers, William Pitt, decided to stay. Pitt's exact lineage is uncertain, but he was probably descended from Thomas Pitt, whose descendants also include William Pitt the Elder, a contemporary of the settlement's founder.

== British settlement ==
Pitt realized that the Black River area provided an ideal location for a settlement for several reasons. One was that the immediately surrounding land could be cultivated, providing crops for food and export, and there was a rich supply of jungle and sea products to export. The area had several water channels leading inland to facilitate (illegal, according to the Spanish) trade with the local natives. Finally, the entrance to the lagoon from the sea was a narrow channel blocked by a shifting sand bar, making a seaborne attack virtually impossible.

=== Early years ===
By 1739, the settlement had grown to the point that Spanish authorities recognized it as a credible threat to their claims and considered military action against it. Rising tensions between Britain and Spain that led to the War of Jenkins' Ear led Jamaica's military governor to request Pitt's assistance in gaining Miskito support in the event of military action, sending Lieutenant Colonel Robert Hodgson to negotiate an agreement with them. Hodgson used Black River as a base for raids against Spanish settlements during the war.

The settlement received a more permanent British military presence in 1744 after the war widened into the War of the Austrian Succession. It remained untouched during the war, despite demands from King Philip for its removal. The Treaty of Aix-la-Chapelle in 1748, which ended the hostilities, specified that colonial territories should be restored to the status quo ante bellum. Spain interpreted this to include the abandonment of British settlements on all of its claimed territory in Central America, while the British claimed that, since Spain had never controlled the area, it was not Spanish territory to return. The British military fortified the lagoon entrance and maintained a small company of infantry at the settlement, but withdrew it in 1751 due to a lack of manpower.

=== Seven Years' War ===
When the Seven Years' War broke out in 1756, Hodgson was sent back to Black River, and its fortifications were beefed up. According to a Spanish report, the settlement had 213 palm-thatched houses, 100 white inhabitants, 600 slaves, and 3,000 armed Miskito and zambos living nearby, along with 30 British regulars. A report prepared by Hodgson in 1757 numbered the white British population of the entire coast at more than 1,000. In the same report, he valued that year's exports from the coast at £25,000, and described the community as an effective entrepôt for direct trade with the natives, and also indirect trade with the Spanish, all supplied by cargos whose origins were sometimes of dubious legality.

The Spanish did not enter the Seven Years' War until 1762. While King Charles ordered the taking of Black River and Belize, the British capture of Havana effectively scuttled the idea, and the Miskitos raided many Spanish settlements, ranging as far as Costa Rica. While the 1763 Treaty of Paris secured British logging rights in Belize, it contained no language concerning the Mosquito Coast settlements similar to that in the 1748 treaty, setting the stage for further conflict. When a Spanish representative arrived to oversee what the Spanish believed to be the agreed destruction of Black River's fortifications, he was shown a letter from London containing the British interpretation of the treaty language; only the intervention of Pitt and James Ottaway, the military commander, prevented his killing at the hands of the Miskitos.

=== Prosperity and internal friction ===
Over the following years the settlement continued to grow and prosper. Trade (legal and illegal) flourished, and plantations grew around the town. A 1771 report put the coast's white population around 200, with 90 of those at Black River. There were about 900 slaves, and more than 100 people of mixed blood, and the settlements' documented exports had risen substantially since the 1757 report. The settlement began to expand more rapidly in 1771 with major investments led by James Lawrie, a British captain who had been posted to the coast several times.

While the land occupied was purchased from the Miskito, these new acquisitions led to grumbling among the Miskito about the fairness of the price they were getting for the land. This led the British superintendent, Robert Hodgson, Jr, (the son of Hodgson and Pitt's daughter Elizabeth), to attempt the establishment of a land title registry and political structures that other British colonies possessed. This led to internal divisions within the independent and free-spirited settlers, and demands for Hodgson's recall. The Jamaican governor delayed until increasing complaints about Hodgson, among them affidavits concerning his attempt to gain possession of Great Corn Island by driving out its settlers, were reviewed and relayed to London and orders were issued in 1775 for his recall.

=== Later years ===
James Lawrie was appointed the settlement's superintendent in 1776 and governed it until its final evacuation in 1787. A Spanish captain reported in that year that the town, which he was able to see from his ship, had four wood-construction houses with shingled roofs, a hospital, and an active sawmill and shipyard. Black River continued to be the economic center of the shore, which, although it was still economically viable, had suffered somewhat from a decline in the value of its exports. The ongoing uncertainty over its legal status was also becoming of increasing concern to politicians in London, especially when Spain entered the War of American Independence in 1779, citing among other reasons the British failure to evacuate the coastal settlements in 1763.

Settlers and natives participated in the British capture of Omoa in October 1779, but Spanish colonial authorities recaptured the fort there after its garrison was reduced by tropical disease. Most of Black River's military garrison, and a large number of Miskito allies, were recruited to participate in Britain's disastrous 1780 expedition against Nicaragua. The Spanish took advantage of the settlement's weakened defences to raid it, scattering its inhabitants and destroying some of its fortifications. While a large garrison was left at Black River upon the abandonment of the San Juan expedition, it was reduced in late 1781.

In March 1782, more than 1,300 Spanish troops led by Matías de Gálvez, the Captain General of Spanish Guatemala, arrived, overwhelming the British garrison that then numbered just 21 men. Lawrie resisted as best he could, but with the arrival of even more Spanish troops, he abandoned the fortifications and fled with his men through the jungle to Cape Gracias a Dios. He was eventually able to regroup a force of about 800 locals. Combined with a supporting force from Jamaica led by Edward Marcus Despard, he returned to Black River, where the Spanish garrison had been significantly reduced by disease. Lawrie and Despard regained control of Black River, taking more than 700 Spanish prisoners.

=== End of British control ===
The 1783 Treaty of Paris that ended the war confirmed Spanish sovereignty over Belize, but again contained ambiguous language concerning the Mosquito Coast. This revived the old arguments that the settlements were not part of the "Spanish Continent" that the treaty referred to, and the British moved in 1785 to begin fortifying the area again. A strong show of force by the British moved the Spanish to request negotiations on the issue. In the Convention of London, signed 14 July 1786, Britain agreed to evacuate the "Country of the Mosquitos" in exchange for an expansion of rights in Belize.

James Lawrie supervised the evacuation of the coast. A total of 2,650 people were evacuated from the coast. Most of whom went to Belize, but others went to Jamaica, Grand Cayman, and Roatán. Control of Black River was formally turned over to Spanish authorities on 29 August 1787 by his son (and grandson of founder William Pitt), William Pitt Lawrie.

== Spanish settlement ==
The Spanish acquired a settlement with a main road about a mile in length, with plantations extending 15 miles (24 km) along the waterways in the area, and two sugar mills. They brought in settlers from the Canary Islands to take over the settlement, but it was an economic failure. Spanish attempts to run the settlement on a purely legitimate basis (without the illicit trade that flourished under the British) were not successful, and their trade with the natives was hampered by not providing goods useful to the natives for trade or other purposes, and by ongoing British smuggling.

The settlement came to an end when a band of Miskito warriors descended on the town on the morning of 4 September 1800 and slaughtered many of its inhabitants. Those who survived fled overland to Trujillo.

== Legacy ==
In the village of Palacios, which now extends along the edges of the lagoon with an airport, remnants of the colony are still to be seen. Cannons of the era are there, as are the remains of the sugar mills. An overgrown cemetery contains the resting place of the settlement's founder, William Pitt.

== See also ==
- Gregor MacGregor#Poyais scheme
