= Edward Despard =

Irish officer in the service of the British Crown (1751–1803)

Edward Marcus Despard
- Attributed to George Romney
- Born: 1751; Coolrain, Camross, Queen's County (now Laois), Kingdom of Ireland
- Died: 21 February 1803 (aged 51–52); Horsemonger Lane Gaol, London
- Cause of death: Execution by hanging
- Occupations: Soldier, colonial administrator, revolutionary
- Employer(s): British Army, British Home Office
- Movement: Society of United Irishmen, London Corresponding Society
- Criminal charge: High treason
- Criminal penalty: Death by hanging followed by beheading

Edward Marcus Despard (1751 – 21 February 1803), an Irish officer of French descent in the service of the British Crown, gained notoriety as a colonial administrator for refusing to recognise race as a distinction in English law and, following his recall to London, as a republican conspirator. Despard's associations with the London Corresponding Society, the United Irishmen and United Britons led to his trial and execution in 1803 as the alleged ringleader of a plot to assassinate the King.

== Ireland, and military service in the Caribbean ==
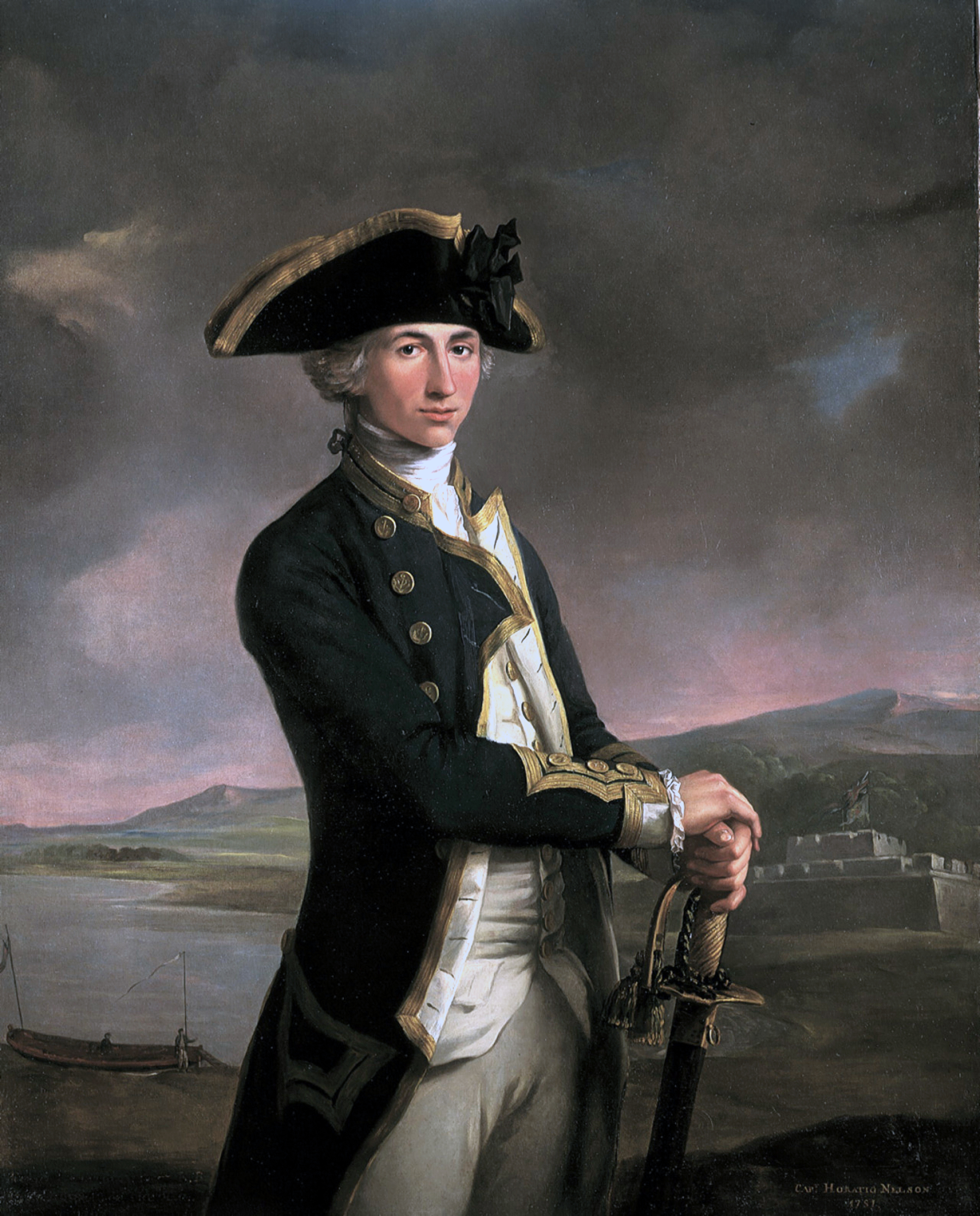
A friend from Caribbean service, Horatio Nelson

Edward Despard was born in 1751 in Coolrain, Camross, Queen's County (now Laois), in the Kingdom of Ireland, the youngest of eight surviving children (six sons, two daughters) of William Despard, a Protestant landowner of Huguenot descent, and Jane Despard (née Walsh). With neighbouring gentry, his father and grandfather enlarged their estate by enclosing "waste", and parish, land to which their tenants had had traditional access. This contributed, in Despard's childhood years, to local Whiteboy disturbances (well remembered by his niece).

Despard was boarded at the Quaker School in Ballitore, County Kildare, which, looking beyond basic literacy, instructed children in mathematics, the classics and, uniquely in Ireland, modern languages. These subjects would not have been neglected when from age eight, Despard began to acquire "the character, the manner, and the habits of a gentleman, and a soldier" as a page in the household of the Lord Hertford, Ambassador to France (1763–65), and Lord Lieutenant of Ireland (1765–66). It is possible that the young Despard was acquainted with David Hume in Paris, where the Scottish enlightenment philosopher and historian attended Hertford as the embassy secretary.

In 1766, aged fifteen, Despard followed his older brothers – one of whom, John Despard (1745–1829), was to rise to the rank of full general – into the British Army. He enrolled as an ensign in the 50th Foot.

Posted with his regiment to Jamaica, Despard served as a defence-works engineer and in 1772 was promoted to lieutenant. His work required him to lead "motley crews", including free blacks, Miskitos and others of mixed-ancestry. In "forming and coordinating the gangs of workers whose labour was his triumph", it has been suggested that Despard was "creolized" in his sympathies".

During the American War of Independence Despard served with distinction in sea-borne descents upon the Spanish Kingdom of Guatemala. He fought alongside Horatio Nelson (and attained the rank of captain) in the San Juan expedition of 1780. Two years later he commanded the British force that, in the Battle of the Black River, recovered British settlements on the Miskito Coast from the Spanish. For this he received a royal commendation and the rank of colonel. While leading reconnoitring missions, Despard again worked intimately with the African-Indian Miskitos. Olaudah Equiano, a former slave who had lived among them in the 1770s, recorded that "These Indians live under an almost perfect equality, and there are no rich or poor among them. They do not strive to accumulate, and the great unwearied exertion, found among our civilised societies, is unknown among them".

== "Without distinction of colour": Superintendent of the Bay of Honduras ==
British logging concessions in the Bay of Honduras, Convention of London 1786

After the Peace of Paris which concluded the war in 1783, Despard was made Superintendent of the British logwood concessions in the Bay of Honduras (present-day Belize). As directed from London, Despard sought to accommodate British subjects, the Shoremen, displaced in the evacuation agreed with the Spanish (Convention of London 1786) of the Miskito Coast. To the dismay of the established Baymen (slave-holding loggers), Despard did so without "any distinction of age, sex, character, respectability, property or colour". He distributed land by lottery in which, the Baymen noted in their petition to London, "the meanest mulatto or free negro has an equal chance". Despard also set aside lands for common use (a reversal of the enclosures to which his family had been party in Ireland) and sought to keep food prices down “for the poorer sort of people”.

To the suggestion from the Home Secretary, Lord Sydney, that it was impolitic to put "affluent settlers and persons of a different description, particularly people of colour" on an "equal footing", Despard replied "the laws of England ... know no such distinction". (He had, on the same principle, overruled a local law excluding Jewish merchants from the Bay.) Persuaded by the Baymen's entreaty that under "Despard's constitution" the "negroes in servitude, observing the now exalted status of their brethren of yesterday [the free, and now propertied, blacks among the Shoremen] would be induced to revolt, and the settlement must be ruined", in 1790 Sydney's successor, Lord Grenville, recalled Despard to London.

Despard had supplied Grenville with a 500-page report in which he characterized the Baymen as an "arbitrary aristocracy". He buttressed his argument with the results of the magistracy election in which he had stood shortly before he left, winning a resounding majority on an unprecedented turnout. But "the cause of electoral representation struck no chord with Grenville": he had bought his own seat in Parliament and had served as Chief Secretary for Ireland without being persuaded of the urgency of extending votes to Catholics.

In the Bay Despard's work was undone. By the 1820s the settlement would have seven legally distinct castes based on skin colour.

== Catherine Despard, "mixed" marriage ==
Before leaving the Bay, in 1790 Despard had married Catherine Gordon, the daughter of a free black woman from Kingston, Jamaica. He arrived in London together with her and their young son, James, as his acknowledged family. There was scarcely precedent in England for what was considered a "mixed-race" marriage. Yet in what may be "a marker of the more fluid and tolerant character of racial attitudes in the Age of Reform", their marriage does not appear to have been publicly challenged.

When following Despard's arrest in 1798, the government sought to discredit Catherine's articulate intercessions on her husband's behalf, they thought it sufficient to observe that she was of the "fair sex". On the floor of the Commons John Courtenay MP (an Irishman), read a letter from Catherine in which she described her husband as being held "in a dark cell, not seven feet square, without fire, or candle, chair, table, knife, fork, a glazed window, or even a book". In reply, the attorney general Sir John Scott suggested that Catherine was being used as a mouthpiece by political subversives: "it was a well-written letter, and the fair sex would pardon him, if he said it was a little beyond their style in general".

At the time of the Despards' arrival in London, the virtue of openly mixed-race marriages was being championed by Olaudah Equiano. Equiano, touring with his autobiography and abolitionist polemic The Interesting Narrative of the Life of ... The African. Himself married to an English woman, Equiano asked: "Why not establish intermarriage at home, and in our colonies, and encourage open, free and generous love, upon Nature’s own wide and extensive plan, subservient only to moral rectitude, without distinction of the colour of a skin?"

The next generation of Despards denied Edward and Catherine's marriage. Family memoirs referred to Catherine as his "black housekeeper", and "the poor woman who called herself his wife". James was ascribed to a previous lover, both of whom were written out of the family tree.

== Irish radical in London ==
Etching by Barlow, based on sketch taken at his trial, January 1803

=== Pitt's "Reign of Terror" ===
Without a further commission and having been pursued by his enemies in the Bay with lawsuits, in London Despard found himself confined for two years in a debtors' prison. There he read Thomas Paine's Rights of Man. A response to Edmund Burke's Reflections on the Revolution in France, it was a vindication of the "wild and Levelling principle of Universal Equality" he had been accused of administering in the Bay.

By the time Despard was released from the King's Bench Prison in 1794, Paine had been forced to take refuge in the new French Republic, with which the British Crown was now at war, and in both Britain and Ireland some of his more ardent admirers were beginning to consider universal franchise and annual parliaments a cause for physical force.

In October 1793, a British Convention in Edinburgh, with delegates from English corresponding societies attending, was broken up by the authorities on charges of sedition. Joseph Gerrald and Maurice Margarot of the London Corresponding Society and their host Thomas Muir of the Society of the Friends of the People were sentenced to fourteen years transportation. When in May 1794 an attempt to indict the radical English MP John Horne Tooke for treason misfired with a jury, the ministry of William Pitt (Grenville's cousin) renewed what was to have been an eight-month suspension of Habeas Corpus.

In the summer of 1795 crowds shouting "No war, no Pitt, cheap bread" attacked the prime minister's residence in Downing Street and surrounded the King in procession to Parliament. There was also a riot at Charing Cross at the scene of which Despard was detained and questioned, something which a magistrate suggested Despard might have avoided had he not, in giving his name, used the "improper title" of "citizen". In October, the government introduced the "Gagging Acts" (Seditious Meetings Act and the Treason Act), which outlawed "seditious" gatherings and rendered even the "contemplation" of force a treasonable offence.

=== United Britons ===
Despard joined the London Corresponding Society (LCS), and was quickly taken on to its central committee. He also took the United Irish pledge (or "Test") "to obtain an equal, full and adequate representation of all the people of Ireland" in a sovereign parliament in Dublin. At a time when the Irish movement was turning increasingly towards the prospects for a French-assisted insurrection, Despard would have found it represented in LCS and other radical circles in London, by the brothers Arthur and Roger O'Connor, and by Jane Greg.

In the summer of 1797 James Coigly, a Catholic priest who had risen to prominence among the United Irishmen during the Armagh Disturbances, arrived from Manchester. There, as a test for "United Englishmen", he had been administering an oath to "Remove the diadem and take off the crown ... [to] exalt him that is low and abuse him that is high". In London, Coigly met with the leading Irish members of the LCS. In addition to Despard, these included Society President Alexander Galloway, and the brothers Benjamin and John Binns. Meetings were held at Furnival's Inn, Holborn, where, convening as the "United Britons", delegates from London, Scotland and the regions committed themselves "to overthrow the present Government, and to join the French as soon as they made a landing in England" (in December 1796 only weather had prevented a major French landing in Ireland).

At this point, it appears that Despard held "a pivotal position between British republicans and France". In June 1797, a government informer reported that a United Irish delegation, travelling to France via London, had applied to Despard for the necessary documents. It is possible that this was Coigly's party.

In December 1797 Coigly returned from France with news of French plans for an invasion, but on 28 February 1798, when seeking again to cross the Channel in a party of five he and Arthur O'Connor were arrested. O'Connor, able to call Charles James Fox, Richard Brinsley Sheridan and Henry Grattan in his defence, was acquitted. Coigly had been caught with a letter to the French Directory from the United Britons and was convicted of treason and hanged in June. While its suggestion of a mass movement primed for insurrection had been scarcely credible, it was sufficient proof of the intent to invite and encourage a French invasion.

Despard, who at his trial Coigly had admitted meeting, remained in contact with United Irishman Valentine Lawless, and was reported as frequenting seditious conclaves in various London ale houses.

=== Detention ===
The government swooped on the London Corresponding Society. On 10 March 1798, Despard was detained at lodgings in Soho, where The Times reported he had been found in bed with "a black woman" (his wife, Catherine). Along with around thirty others, he was held without charge in Coldbath Fields, a recently rebuilt high-security prison in Clerkenwell. Despard, despite Catherine's lobbying efforts, was held for three years.

During this time the authorities saw the hand not only of English radicals but also, with a large Irish contingent among the sailors, of United Irishmen in the Spithead and Nore mutinies of April and May 1797. They seized upon the leading role of Valentine Joyce at Spithead, described by Edmund Burke as "seditious Belfast clubist". Further repressive measures followed. The Corresponding Societies were comprehensively suppressed and the Combination Laws of 1799 and 1800 rendered union activity among workers criminal.

=== Return to Ireland and renewed engagement ===
With hostilities with France suspended by the Treaty of Amiens, Despard, who had not been charged, was released in May 1802. There was no indication that he was intending to renew his seditious activity – in prison he had petitioned for voluntary transportation. But he returned to Ireland where he met with William Dowdall, recently released from Fort George in Scotland. With Thomas Russell and other state prisoners, Dowdall had been in contact with the young militants Robert Emmet and William Putnam McCabe who were determined to reorganise United Irishmen on a strict military-conspiratorial basis. Members would be chosen personally by its officers, meeting as the executive directory. The immediate aim of the reconstituted society was, in conjunction with simultaneous risings in Ireland and England, to again solicit a French invasion. The roving McCabe (Belfast, Dublin, Glasgow, Manchester, London, Hamburg, Paris) was to take up the role that had been Coigly's .

Despard may also have been swayed by what he observed in his home county of Queens (Laois). Government informers were reporting that while the Rebellion that had flared in 1798 had been "put down" it was "by no means suppressed. The blaze is only smothered".

Meanwhile, in England, the influx of refugees from Ireland, the angry response of workers to the Combination Acts, and continued protest over food shortages encouraged renewed organisation among former conspirators. A military system and pike manufacture began to spread across the mill districts of Lancashire and Yorkshire, and regular meetings resumed between county and London delegates.

== Treason trial ==
On 16 November 1802, not long after again meeting Dowdall (who on his return to Ireland, had spoken openly of an insurrectionary conspiracy in London, at a dinner party) Despard was arrested. He was seized attending a meeting of 40 working men at the Oakley Arms public house in Lambeth. Taken in chains to be interrogated by the Privy Council the next day, he was charged with High Treason. Government informers named him as the ringleader of a United Britons conspiracy that engaged, alongside day-labourers and journeymen, no fewer than 300 Grenadier Guardsmen in plans to assassinate King George III and seize the Tower of London and Bank of England. Despard was prosecuted by Attorney General Spencer Perceval, before Lord Ellenborough, the Lord Chief Justice in a Special Commission on Monday, 7 February 1803.

Perceval had evidence that others in the club room of the Oakley Arms had discussed an insurrectionary plot with connections (he did not see fit to detail in court) to a northern underground: United Englishmen committed to rise on news of a coup in London. The Oakley Arms, however, did not appear from the testimony to have been the headquarters of the conspiracy, and Despard had only been there on one occasion before his arrest. To implicate Despard, Perceval relied heavily on the many mentions of his name in United Irish correspondence. But at "several stages removed from the colonel's actions" these were often from persons Despard had never met.

It is possible that Despard had been little more than an intended figurehead for a rising, chosen as someone who gained some public notoriety and sympathy for his harsh imprisonment in Cold Bath Fields.

Lord Nelson, then famous for his victory in the Battle of the Nile, made a dramatic appearance as a character witness in Despard's defence: "We went on the Spanish Main together; we slept many nights together in our clothes upon the ground; we have measured the height of the enemies wall together. In all that period of time no man could have shewn more zealous attachment to his Sovereign and his Country". But Nelson had to admit to having "lost sight of Despard for the last twenty years." The same was conceded by General Sir Alured Clarke and Sir Evan Nepean who similarly testified to Despard's military service.

In the end, the jury was satisfied with a prosecution case that connected Despard to only one overt act, the administration of illegal oaths. But perhaps moved by the Vice-Admiral's testimony, they recommended clemency. In denying their motion, Ellenborough emphasised the revolutionary nature of Despard's purpose. This he claimed had been not only to rend the new union between Great Britain and Ireland, but also to affect "the forcible reduction to one common level of all the advantages of property, of all civil and political rights whatsoever". Together with John Wood, 36, John Francis, 23, both guardsmen, Thomas Broughton, 26, a carpenter, James Sedgwick Wratton, 35, a shoemaker, Arthur Graham, 53, a slater, and John Macnamara, a labourer, Despard was sentenced to be hanged, drawn and quartered.

== Execution ==
Edward Despard addresses the crowd at his execution, 1803.

With Nelson's assistance, Catherine Despard appealed for clemency to both the Prime Minister and the King, but secured only a waiving of the then already archaic rites of disembowelment. Magistrates, however, insisted on the "drawing" – there had never been a conviction for high treason without dragging the sentenced to the gallows in a carriage without wheels. Seated for the purpose of the drawing backwards upon hay bales and bumped across the cobbled courtyard of Horsemonger Lane Gaol, Despard burst out laughing. The sentence was not passed again.

Edward Despard and his six co-defendants were hanged and decapitated on the roof of the gatehouse at Horsemonger Lane Gaol on 21 February 1803. The authorities had feared a public demonstration. Constables were ordered to watch "all the public houses and other places of resort for the disaffected", and the jail keeper was issued a rocket to launch as a signal to the military in the event of trouble. During the trial crowds had come nightly to surround the jail and there had been difficulty finding workmen willing to construct the scaffold.

Despard had declined to take divine service. He averred that while "outward forms of worship were useful for political purposes", he thought "the opinions of Churchmen, Dissenters, Quakers, Methodists, Catholics, Savages, or even Atheists, were equally indifferent". He was permitted a final meeting with his wife during which, according to reports, "the Colonel betrayed nothing like an unbecoming weakness".

With the hangman's noose loosely around his neck, Despard stepped to the edge of the platform, and addressed a crowd, estimated at twenty thousand (until the funeral of Lord Nelson following the Battle of Trafalgar the largest gathering London had witnessed), with words Catherine may have helped him prepare:

Fellow Citizens, I come here, as you see, after having served my Country faithfully, honourably and usefully, for thirty years and upwards, to suffer death upon a scaffold for a crime of which I protest I am not guilty. I solemnly declare that I am no more guilty of it than any of you who may be now hearing me. But though His Majesty’s Ministers know as well as I do that I am not guilty, yet they avail themselves of a legal pretext to destroy a man, because he has been a friend to truth, to liberty, and to justice

[a considerable huzzah from the crowd]

because he has been a friend to the poor and to the oppressed. But, Citizens, I hope and trust, notwithstanding my fate, and the fate of those who no doubt will soon follow me, that the principles of freedom, of humanity, and of justice, will finally triumph over falsehood, tyranny and delusion, and every principle inimical to the interests of the human race.

[a warning from the Sheriff]

I have little more to add, except to wish you all health, happiness and freedom, which I have endeavoured, as far as was in my power, to procure for you, and for mankind in general.

After Despard was hanged and his body decapitated, the executioner, William Brunskill, held the head by the hair to the view of the populace and exclaimed "This is the head of a traitor, Edward Marcus Despard".

== Epilogue ==
Catherine Despard's final service to her husband was to insist on his hereditary right to be buried in St Faith's in the City of London, an old graveyard that had been subsumed within the walls of St Paul's Cathedral, a campaign she won despite protests to the government from the Lord Mayor of London. On the day of the funeral (held 1 March to allow their son James, who was serving in the French army, to return from Paris), people lined the street from their last residence in Lambeth, across Blackfriars Bridge, towards St Paul's, at which point they dispersed in silence.

After his death, there was a report of Catherine Despard being taken under the "protection" of Lady Nelson. The MP Sir Francis Burdett, who with Horne Tooke had assisted in the defence, helped arrange a pension. She spent some time in Ireland, a guest of Valentine Lawless, 2nd Baron Cloncurry who had been detained with Despard in 1798. Catherine Despard died in Somers Town, London, in 1815.

Their son James returned to Britain after the Napoleonic Wars. The final trace of him in the family records is an episode recounted by General John Despard, Edward's older brother, who was leaving a London theatre when he heard a carriage driver calling the family name. He made his way towards the carriage he assumed was his, "and there appeared a flashy Creole and a flashy young lady on his arm, and they both stepped into it".

== In popular culture ==
Madame Tussauds famous waxworks in London showcased an effigy of Edward Despard, using him as one of the first British criminals to be featured in her ‘Adjoining Room’, now known as the Chamber of Horrors.

Despard appears as a character in the fifth series of the popular British television drama Poldark (2015-2019), played by Vincent Regan. The screenplay is based on the Poldark series of 12 historical novels, published between 1947 and 2002, by Winston Graham.

== Bibliography ==
- Conner, Clifford D., Colonel Despard: The Life and Times of an Anglo-Irish Rebel. Combined Publishing, 2000. ISBN 978-1580970266.
- Jay, Mike, The Unfortunate Colonel Despard. Bantam Press, 2004. ISBN 978-1472144065.
- Linebaugh, Peter. Red Round Globe Hot Burning. University of California Press, 2019. ISBN 978-0520299467.
- Oman, Charles William Chadwick. Unfortunate Colonel Despard and Other Studies. Burt Franklin, 1922.
- O'Broin, Seoirse (1986). United Irishmen, the London Connection (PDF). Irish in Britain History Group. p. 5.

Government offices
Preceded by James Lawrie	Superintendent of British Honduras; 1787–1790	Succeeded by Peter Hunter
