= Spain and the American Revolutionary War =

18th-century war between Great Britain and Spain

Anglo-Spanish War (1779–1783)
- Part of the Anglo-French War (1778–1783), the American Revolutionary War and the Anglo-Spanish Wars
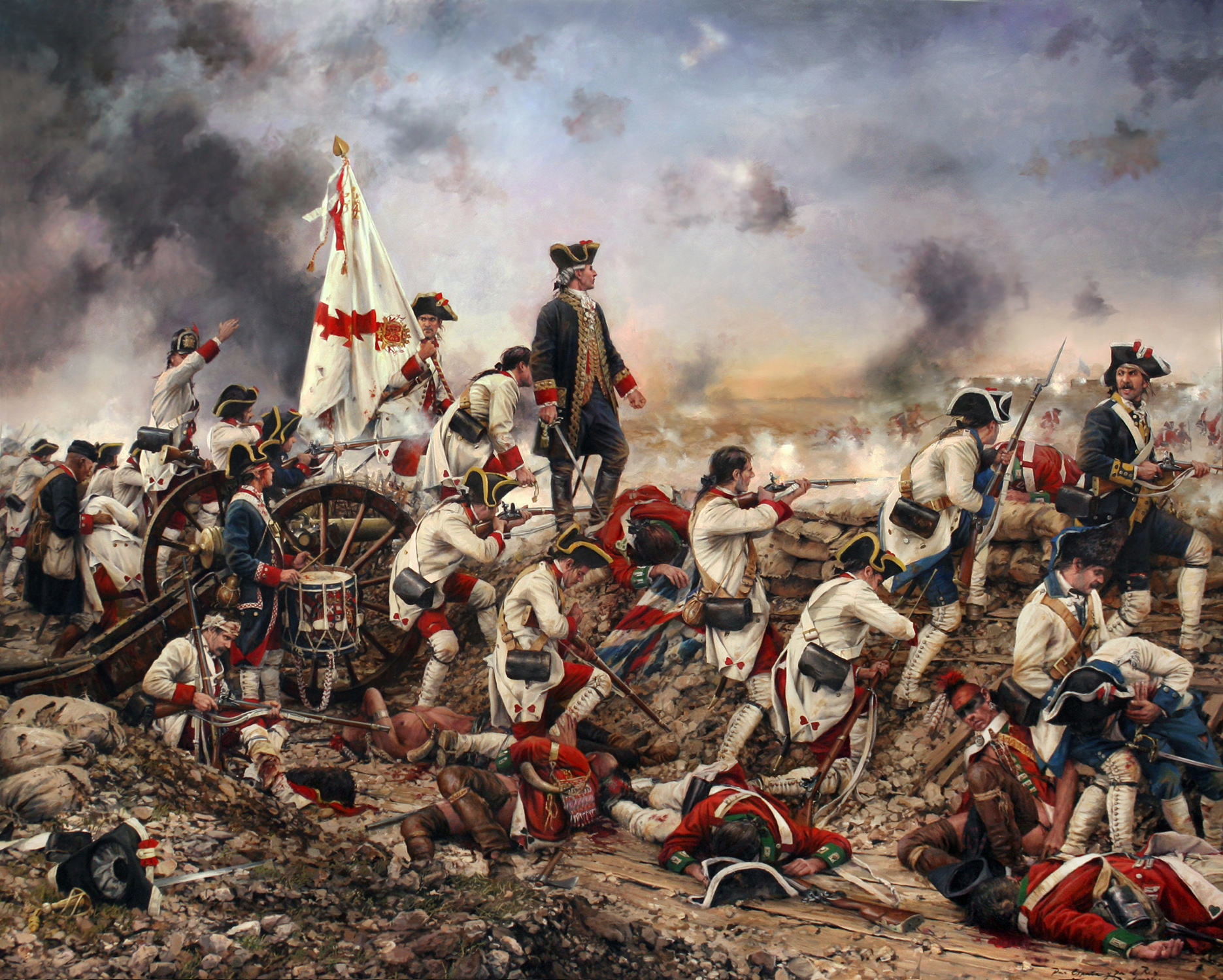
- Bernardo de Gálvez at the siege of Pensacola, painting by Augusto Ferrer-Dalmau
Date	June 1779 – September 1783
Location	English Channel, Straits of Gibraltar, Balearic Islands, Atlantic Ocean, Caribbean Sea, The Bahamas, Central America, Louisiana, Alabama, Missouri, Illinois, Florida, Arkansas
Result	Spanish victory Peace of Paris; Convention of London
Territorial changes	East Florida, West Florida, Mosquito Coast, Bay Islands, and Minorca ceded to Spain; Belize is demilitarized

Belligerents
Spain	Great Britain

Commanders and leaders
Bernardo de Gálvez; Matías de Gálvez; Luis de Córdova y Córdova; Juan de Lángara	George Brydges Rodney; Richard Howe; George Augustus Eliott; John Campbell

Spain, through its alliance with France and as part of the Anglo-French War (1778–1783) with Britain, played an important role in the independence of the United States. Spain declared war on Britain as an ally of France, itself an ally of the American colonies, so Spain and the United States were cobelligerents. Most notably, Spanish forces attacked British positions in the south and captured West Florida from Britain in the siege of Pensacola. This secured the southern route for supplies and closed off the possibility of any British offensive through the western frontier of the United States via the Mississippi River. Spain also provided money, supplies, and munitions to the American forces.

Beginning in 1776, it jointly funded Roderigue Hortalez and Company, a trading company that provided critical military supplies. Spain provided financing for the final siege of Yorktown in 1781 with a collection of gold and silver in Havana, then Spanish Cuba. Spain was allied with France through the Bourbon Family Compact and the Revolution was an opportunity to confront their common enemy, Great Britain. As the newly appointed Chief Minister of King Charles III of Spain, the Count of Floridablanca wrote in March 1777, "the fate of the colonies interests us very much, and we shall do for them everything that circumstances permit".

== Aid to the United States: 1776–1778 ==
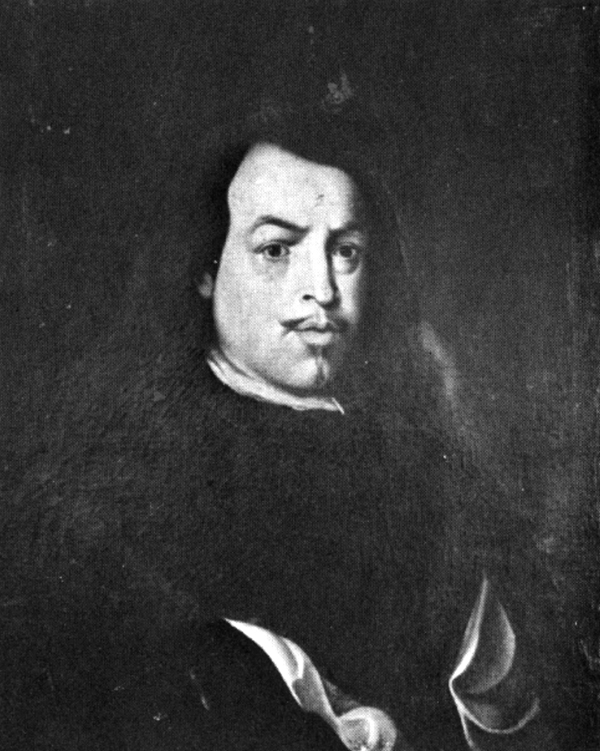
Luis de Unzaga was the first Spanish official to provide direct military aid to the Continental Army during the American Revolution.

Spanish Louisiana governor Luis de Unzaga was given clear directives from Madrid and Havana: he was to remain officially neutral while quietly favoring the American rebels. This explains why, in April 1776, he provided safe harbor in New Orleans to several rebel ships fleeing the Royal Navy—an action that risked provoking British military retaliation and potentially forcing Spain into an immediate war. The following month, he established a front company in New Orleans under the name Roderigue Hortalez et Cie, naming the playwright Pierre-Augustin de Beaumarchais as its director. Through this fictitious firm, Unzaga secretly funneled gunpowder, firearms, blankets, food, medicines, and other essential supplies to the colonial rebels, all without arousing British suspicions.

In July 1776, France and Spain agreed to finance the initial large-scale joint arms shipment. American diplomat Arthur Lee informed Congress that Spain would extend a confidential line of credit worth four million reales de vellón—equivalent to roughly 500,000 Continental dollars (more than $17 million in 2024 dollars). This marked Spain's initial aid to the poorly equipped Continental Army, funding the acquisition of 216 cannons, 27 mortars, 238 gun carriages, 12,826 grenades, 51,134 rounds, 300,000 pounds of gunpowder, 30,000 muskets with bayonets, 4,000 tents and 30,000 full uniforms. With the aid of these timely Spanish provisions, General Horatio Gates triumphed over General John Burgoyne at Saratoga on 17 October 1777.

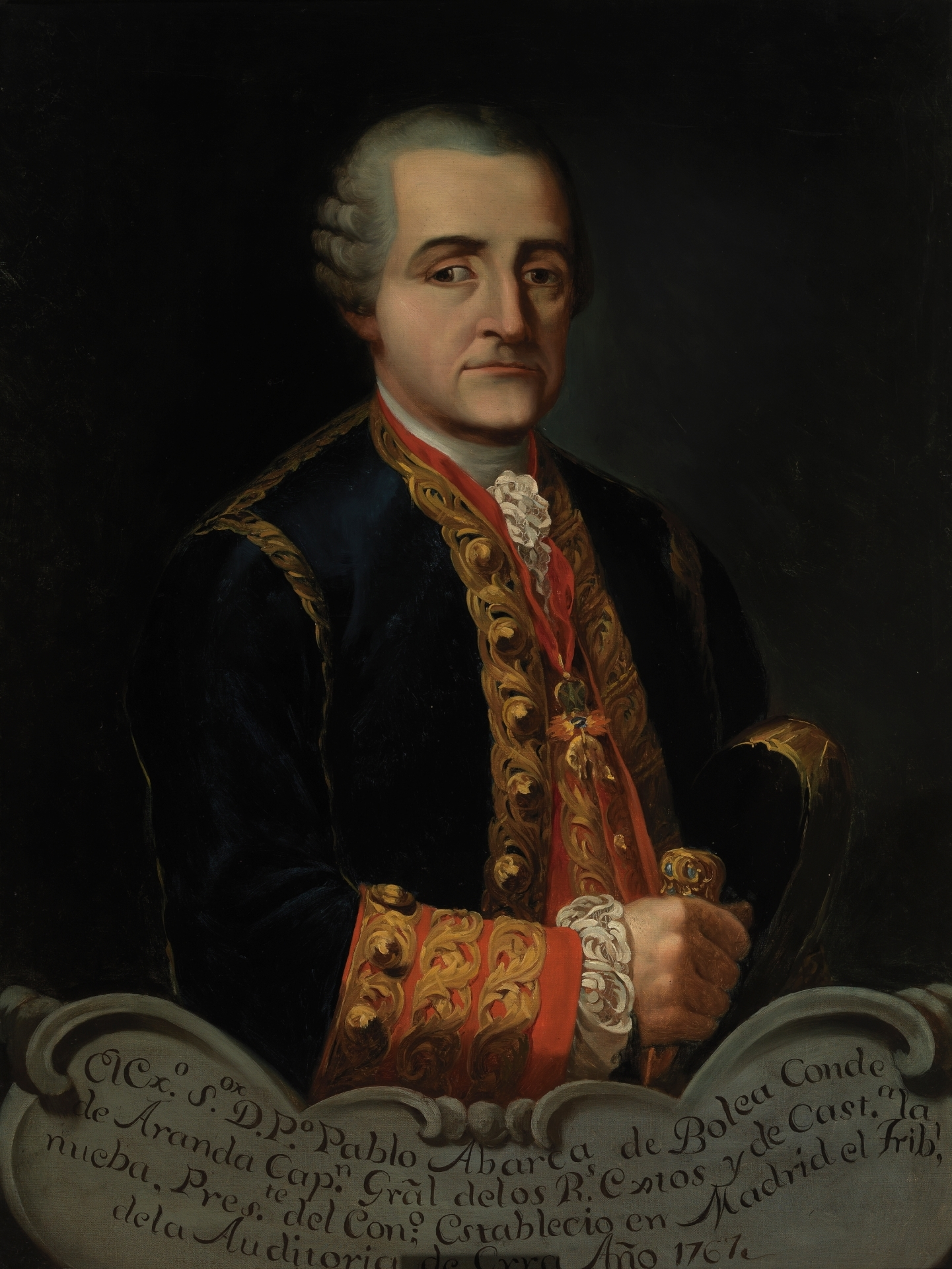
Portrait by Francisco Jover y Casanova of Aranda

The same year, in correspondence with Spain’s envoy in Paris, the Count of Aranda from Aragon, Benjamin Franklin expressed gratitude for Spain’s further loan of nearly 200,000 livres in cash, “along with naval provisions from its harbors.”

Spanish aid was supplied to the new nation through four main routes: from French ports with the funding of Rodrigue Hortalez and Company, through the port of New Orleans and up the Mississippi River, from the warehouses in Havana, and from Bilbao, through the Gardoqui family trading company. Spain made loans to the United States to be used to furnish war supplies through the House of Gardoqui.

Smuggling from New Orleans began in 1776 when General Charles Lee sent two Continental Army (the army of the United States) officers to request supplies from the New Orleans Governor, Luis de Unzaga. Unzaga, concerned about overtly antagonizing the British before the Spanish were prepared for war, agreed to assist the rebels covertly. Unzaga authorized the shipment of desperately needed gunpowder in a transaction brokered by Oliver Pollock, a Patriot (Revolutionary) and financier. When Bernardo de Gálvez y Madrid, Count of Gálvez was appointed Governor of New Orleans in January 1777, he continued and expanded the supply operations.

As the American diplomat Benjamin Franklin reported from Paris to the Congressional Committee of Secret Correspondence in March 1777, the Spanish court quietly granted the rebels direct admission to the rich, previously restricted port of Havana under most favored nation status. Franklin also noted in the same report that three thousand barrels of gunpowder were waiting in New Orleans and that the merchants in Bilbao "had orders to ship for us such necessaries as we might want".

== Declaration of war ==
In 1777, Spain won the conflict with Britain's ally Portugal over territories in South America, allowing it to consider the next moves. In the First Treaty of San Ildefonso, signed on 1 October 1777, after Mary I of Portugal had dismissed Pombal, Spain won the Banda Oriental (Uruguay), with Colonia del Sacramento, founded by Portugal in 1680. Spain also won the Misiones Orientales. In return, Spain acknowledged that Portuguese territories in Brazil extended far west of the line set in the Treaty of Tordesillas. In the Treaty of El Pardo, signed 11 March 1778, Spain won Spanish Guinea (Equatorial Guinea), which was administered from Buenos Aires in 1778–1810. With these treaties, Portugal had left the war, and in 1781 Portugal even joined the First League of Armed Neutrality to resist British seizures of cargo from neutral ships. The countries forming the League might have aided Britain in the widening conflict, but their neutrality left Britain without European allies.

The former Spanish diplomat and then-Ambassador to the French Court, Jerónimo Grimaldi, 1st Duke of Grimaldi, summarized the Spanish position in a letter to American diplomat Arthur Lee, who was in Madrid trying to persuade Spain to make an open alliance with the fledgling United States, as France had. Genoese by birth and a shrewdly calculating politician by nature, Grimaldi demurred, replying, "You have considered your own situation, and not ours. The moment is not yet come for us. The war with Portugal – France being unprepared, and our cargo ships from South America not having arrived – makes it improper for us to declare immediately." Grimaldi reassured Lee that stores of clothing and powder were deposited for the Americans in the port of New Orleans, now under Spanish control, and Havana; further shipments of blankets were being collected at Bilbao.

Spain signed the Treaty of Aranjuez in April 1779. By June 1779 the Spanish had finalized their preparations for war. The British cause seemed to be at a particularly low ebb. Spain joined France in the Anglo-French War (1778–1783), implementing the treaty. Spain did not make a formal treaty of alliance with the Americans.

== European waters ==
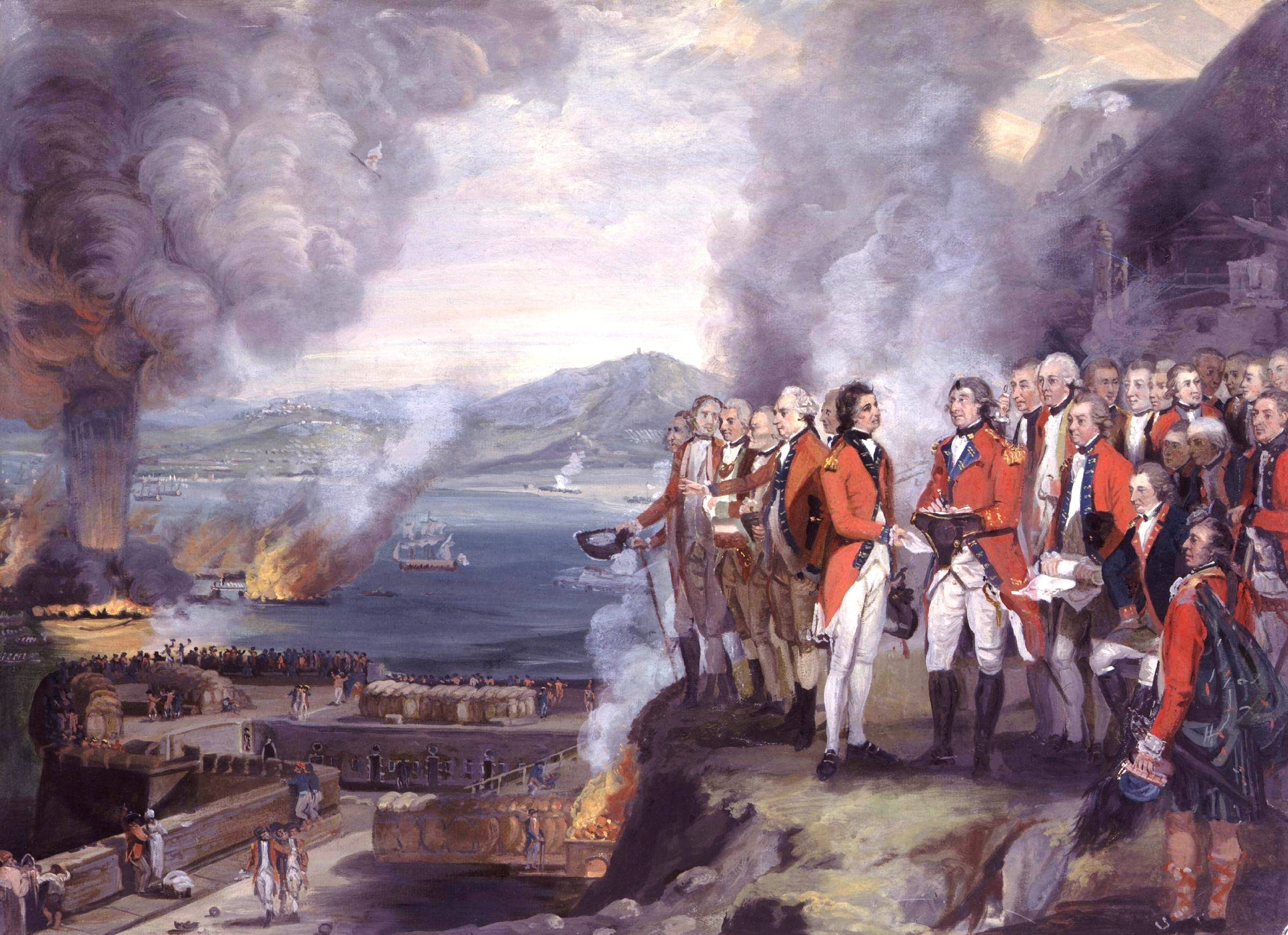
The Great Siege of Gibraltar, showing the defeat of the Franco-Spanish assault in September 1782 by George Carter

The main goals of Spain were the recovery of Gibraltar and Menorca from Britain, which held them since 1704, and to damage British trade through the actions of privateers. The siege of Gibraltar, 16 June 1779, to 7 February 1783, was the longest-lasting Spanish action in the war. Despite the larger size of the besieging Franco-Spanish army, at one point numbering 33,000, the British under George Augustus Elliott were able to hold out in the fortress and were resupplied by sea three times. Luis de Córdova y Córdova was unable to prevent Howe's fleet returning home after resupplying Gibraltar in October 1782. The combined Franco-Spanish invasion of Menorca in 1781 met with more success; Menorca surrendered the following year, and was restored to Spain after the war, nearly eighty years after it was first captured by the British. In 1780 and 1781, Luis de Córdova's fleet captured America-bound British convoys, doing much damage to British military supplies and commerce.

== West Indies and Gulf Coast ==
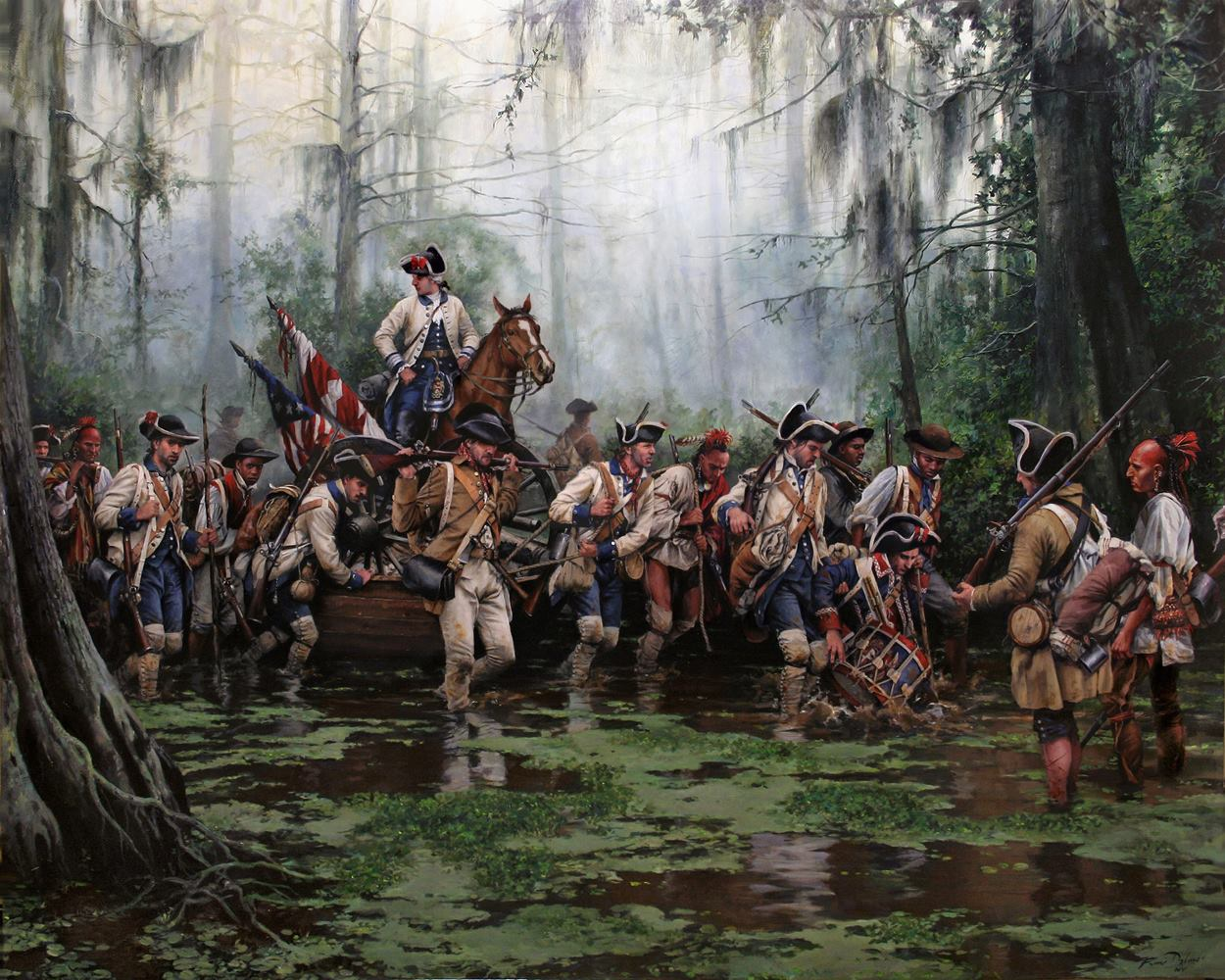
Painting depicting the Spanish advance at the lower Mississippi by Augusto Ferrer-Dalmau

In the Caribbean, Spain's main effort was directed at preventing possible British landings in Cuba, remembering the British expedition against Cuba that seized Havana in the Seven Years' War, but returned to Spain in 1763 following the peace treaty. Other goals included the reconquest of Florida (which the British had divided into West Florida and East Florida in 1763), and the resolution of logging disputes involving the British in Central America.

On the mainland, the governor of Spanish Louisiana, Count Bernardo de Gálvez, led a series of successful offensives against the British forts in the Mississippi Valley, first the attack and capture of Fort Bute at Manchac, and then forcing the surrender of Baton Rouge, Natchez and Mobile in 1779 and 1780. While a hurricane in 1780 halted an expedition to capture Pensacola, the capital of British West Florida, Gálvez's forces achieved a decisive victory against the British in 1781 at the Battle of Pensacola, giving the Spanish control of all of West Florida. This secured the southern route for supplies and closed off the possibility of any British offensive into the western frontier of United States via the Mississippi River.

When Spain entered the war, Britain also went on the offensive in the Caribbean, planning an expedition against Spanish Nicaragua. A British attempt to gain a foothold at San Fernando de Omoa was rebuffed in October 1779, and an expedition in 1780 against Fort San Juan in Nicaragua was at first successful, but yellow fever and other tropical diseases wiped out most of the force, which then withdrew and returned to Jamaica.

== Mississippi Valley ==
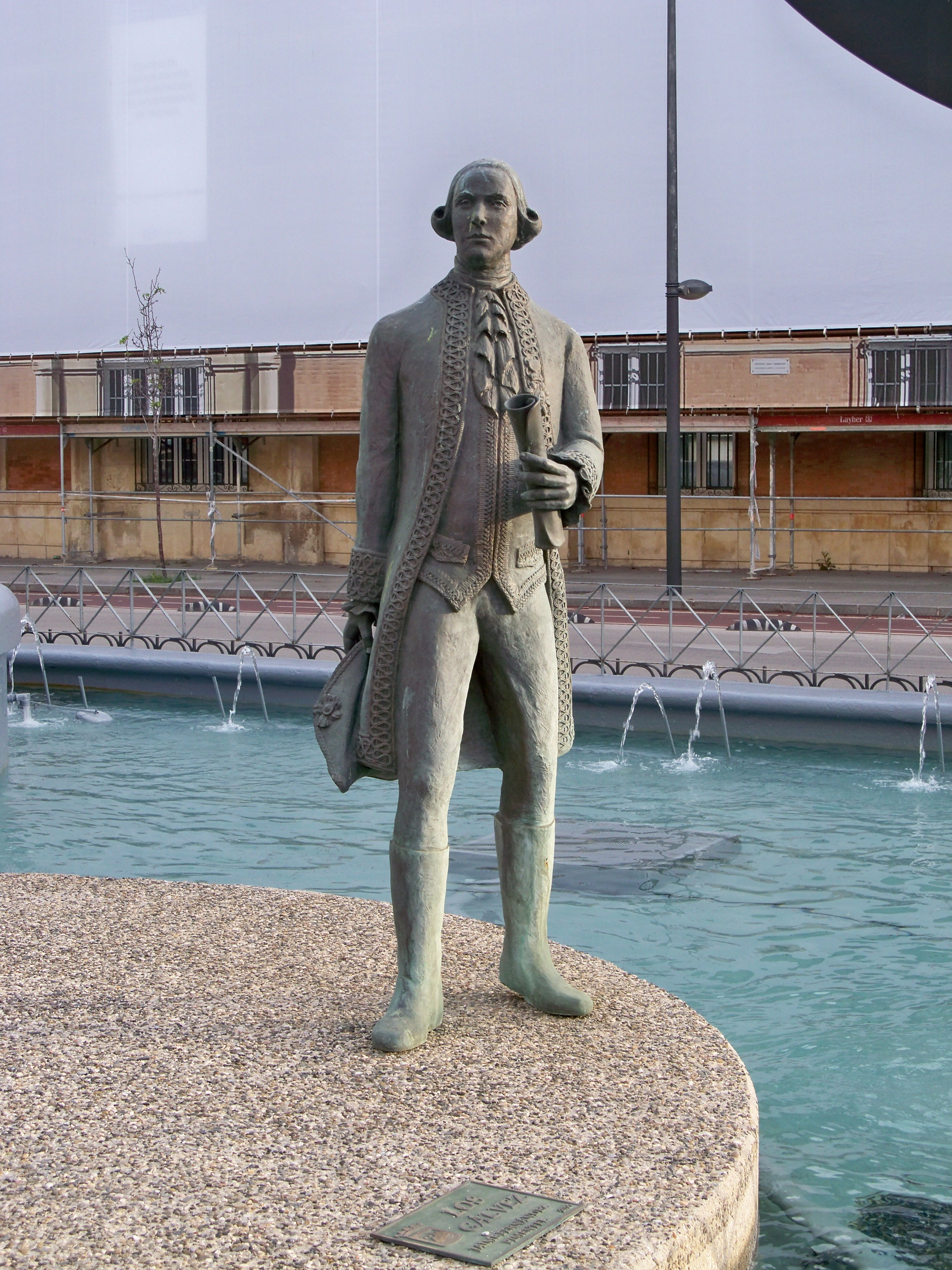
Statue of the Viscount of Galveston in Málaga

At the end of the Seven Years' War, France ceded the Mississippi Valley to her ally Spain, in order to prevent it from coming under British control at the Treaty of Paris (1763). The Spanish assisted the United States in their campaigns in the American Midwest. In January 1778, Virginia Governor Patrick Henry authorized an expedition by George Rogers Clark, who captured the fort at Vincennes and secured the northern region of the Ohio for the rebels. Clark relied on Gálvez and Oliver Pollock for support to supply his men with weapons and ammunition, and to provide credit for provisions. The credit lines that Pollock established to purchase supplies for Clark were supposed to be backed by the state of Virginia. However, Pollock in turn had to rely on his own personal credit and Gálvez, who allowed the funds of the Spanish government to be at Pollock's disposal as loans. These funds were usually delivered in the cover of night by Gálvez's private secretary.

The Spanish garrisons in the Louisiana region repelled attacks from British units and the latter's Indian allies in the Battle of Saint Louis in 1780. A year later, a detachment traveled through present-day Illinois and took Fort St. Joseph, in the modern state of Michigan. This expedition gave Spain some claim to the Northwest Territory, which was thwarted diplomatically by Great Britain and the young United States in their separate peace in the Treaty of Paris (1783).

== Siege of Yorktown ==
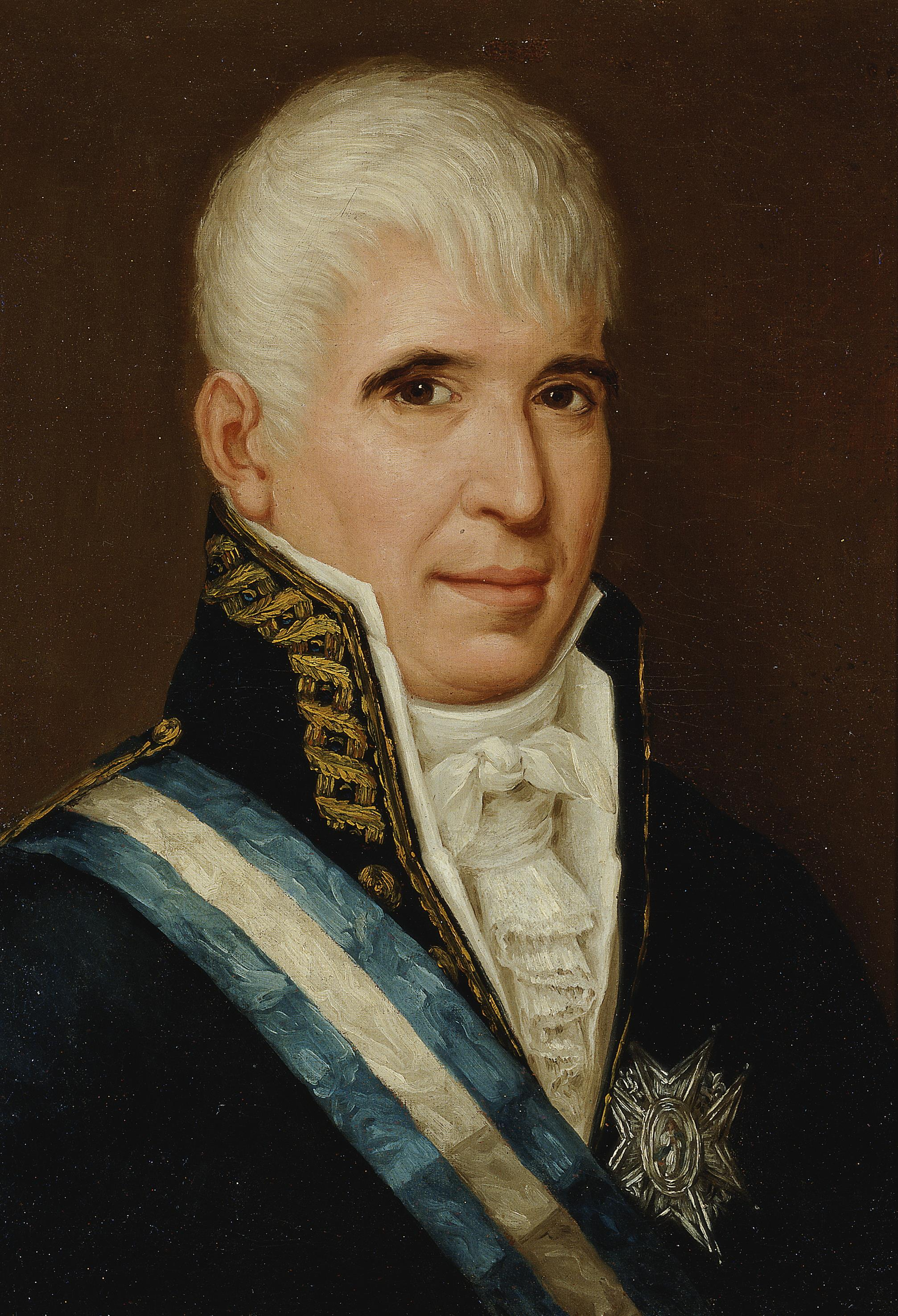
Francisco Saavedra (Prado museum).

The Spanish also assisted in the siege of Yorktown in 1781, the critical and final major battle of the North America theater. French General Jean-Baptiste Donatien de Vimeur, comte de Rochambeau, commanding his country's forces in North America, sent a desperate appeal to François Joseph Paul de Grasse, the French admiral designated to assist the Americans, asking him to raise money in the Caribbean to fund the campaign at Yorktown. With the assistance of Spanish agent Francisco Saavedra de Sangronis, the needed cash, over 500,000 in silver pesos, was raised in Havana, Cuba within 24 hours. This money was used to purchase critical supplies for the siege, and to fund the payroll for the Continental Army.

== Antilles War ==
After Spain entered the war, Major General John Dalling, the British governor and commander-in-chief of Jamaica, proposed in 1780 an expedition to the Spanish province of Nicaragua. The goal was to sail up the San Juan River to Lake Nicaragua and capture the town of Granada, which would effectively cut Spanish America in half as well as provide potential access to the Pacific Ocean. Because of disease and logistical problems, the expedition proved to be a costly debacle.

The expedition sailed from Jamaica on 3 February 1780, escorted by twenty-one-year-old Captain Horatio Nelson in the Hinchinbrook. Nelson was the highest-ranking officer present, but his authority was limited to naval operations. The overall commander was Captain (local rank of major) John Polson of the 60th Regiment, who recognized young Nelson's abilities and worked closely with him. Polson had about three to four hundred regulars of the 60th and the 79th Regiments, about 300 men of the Loyal Irish Corps raised by Dalling, as well as several hundred local recruits, including blacks and Miskito Indians.

After many delays, the expedition began to move up the San Juan River on 17 March 1780. On 9 April, Nelson—in the first hand-to-hand combat of his career—led an assault that captured a Spanish battery on the island of Bartola on the San Juan River. The siege of Fort San Juan, located five miles (8 km) upstream and manned with about 150 armed defenders and 86 others, began on 13 April. Because of poor planning and lost supplies, the British soon began to run low on ammunition for the cannons as well as rations for the men. After the tropical rains started on 20 April, men began to sicken and die, probably from malaria and dysentery, and perhaps typhoid fever.

Nelson was one of the first to become ill, and he was shipped downriver on 28 April, the day before the Spanish surrendered the fort. About 450 British reinforcements arrived on 15 May, but the blacks and the Indians abandoned the expedition because of illness and discontent. Although Dalling persisted in trying to gather reinforcements, a sickness continued to take a heavy toll, and the expedition was abandoned on 8 November 1780. The Spanish reoccupied the remains of the fort after the British blew it up upon departure. In all, more than 2,500 men died, which "made the San Juan expedition the costliest British disaster of the entire war".

Following these successes, an unauthorized Spanish force captured the Bahamas in 1782, without a battle. In 1783 Gálvez was preparing to invade Jamaica from Cuba, but these plans were aborted when Britain sued for peace.

== Peace of Paris ==
The reforms made by Spanish authorities as a result of Spain's poor performance in the Seven Years' War had proved generally successful. As a result, Spain retained Menorca and West Florida in the Treaty of Paris and also regained East Florida. The lands east of the Mississippi, however, were recognized as part of the newly independent United States of America.

== Contribution to victory ==
The involvement of France was decisive in the British defeat. Spain's contribution was important too. By allying themselves with foreign monarchies, the United States took advantage of the power struggles within European imperialism and essentially formed a united front against Britain. The new nation was eager to spread republicanism, which could threaten Spain's own colonies, and later did so, in the Latin American wars of independence. Nevertheless, Spain maintained a level of support throughout the war in pursuit of its geopolitical interests. Historian Thomas A. Bailey says of Spain:

Although she was attracted by the prospect of a war [against England] for restitution and revenge, she was repelled by the specter of an independent and powerful American republic. Such a new state might reach over the Alleghenies into the Mississippi Valley and grasp territory that Spain wanted for herself. Even worse, it might eventually seize Spain's colonies in the New World.

Other authors, such as Jean-Pierre Cap, have argued, however, that Spain's contribution to American independence was limited. According to Cap, military campaigns such as Bernardo de Gálvez's capture of West Florida, the conquest of Minorca, and the unsuccessful siege of Gibraltar had only a marginal impact on the outcome of the war

Cap also maintains that the extent of Spanish financial assistance to the American revolutionaries has been considerably exaggerated and that such aid was not particularly significant. He further argues that the prevailing attitude among Spain's leading ministers was one of opposition to the American rebellion, and that Spain entered the war primarily to recover its lost territories and colonial possessions. The Spanish government was also concerned that the independence movement might encourage similar separatist aspirations within its own American territories. Furthermore, Cap contends that most of Spain's military operations and engagements during the conflict were sustained with French military support, owing to Spain's limited capabilities.

== Aftermath ==
North American borders proposed by the Spanish diplomacy near the end of the American Revolutionary War, 3 August 1782

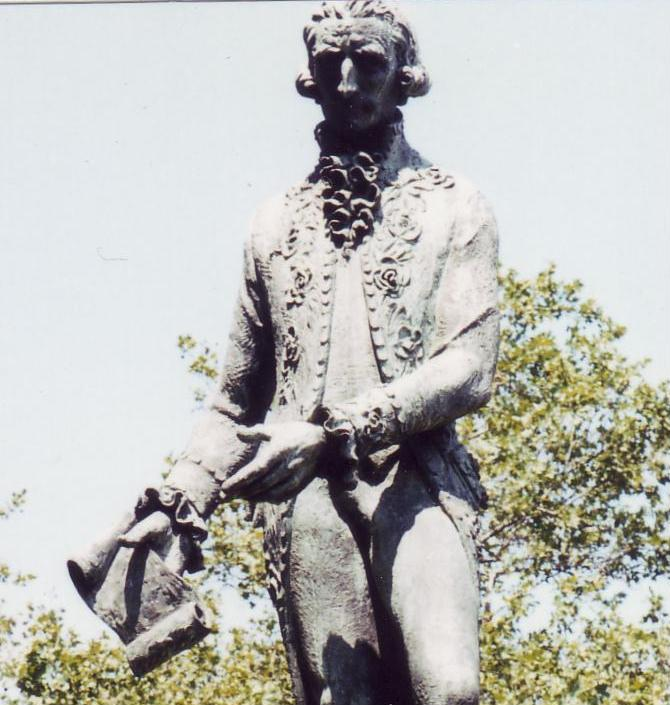
Philadelphia statue of Gardoqui by Luis Antonio Sanguino

Spain's involvement in the American Revolutionary War was widely regarded as a successful one. The Spanish took a gamble in entering the war, banking on Great Britain's vulnerability caused by the effort of fighting their rebellious colonists in North America while also conducting a global war on many fronts against a coalition of major powers. This helped Spain gain some relatively easy conquests.

The war gave a boost to the kingdom's prestige, which had suffered from the losses to Britain in the Seven Years' War. Even though Spain's single most coveted target, Gibraltar, remained out of its grasp, Spain had more than compensated by recovering Menorca and by reducing the British threat to its colonies in and around the Caribbean, all of which were seen as vital to Spanish interests.

Spain was seen to have received tangible results out of the war, especially in contrast to its ally France. The French king had invested huge amounts of manpower, funds and material resources for little clear military or economic gain. France had been left with crippling debts which it struggled to pay off, and which would become one of the major causes of the French Revolution that broke out in 1789. Spain, in comparison, disposed of its debts more easily, partly due to the stunning increases in silver production from the mines in Mexico and Bolivia.

One particular outcome of the war was the manner in which it enhanced the position of Prime Minister Floridablanca, and his government continued to dominate Spanish politics until 1792.

Don Diego de Gardoqui, of the Gardoqui trading company that had greatly assisted the rebels during the war, was appointed as Spain's first ambassador to the United States of America in 1784. Gardoqui became well acquainted with George Washington, and marched in the newly elected President Washington's inaugural parade. King Charles III of Spain continued communications with Washington, sending him livestock from Spain that Washington had requested for his farm at Mount Vernon.

== See also ==
- Spain-United States relations
- Diplomacy in the American Revolutionary War
- Spain and the American Civil War
