= Spain and the American Civil War =

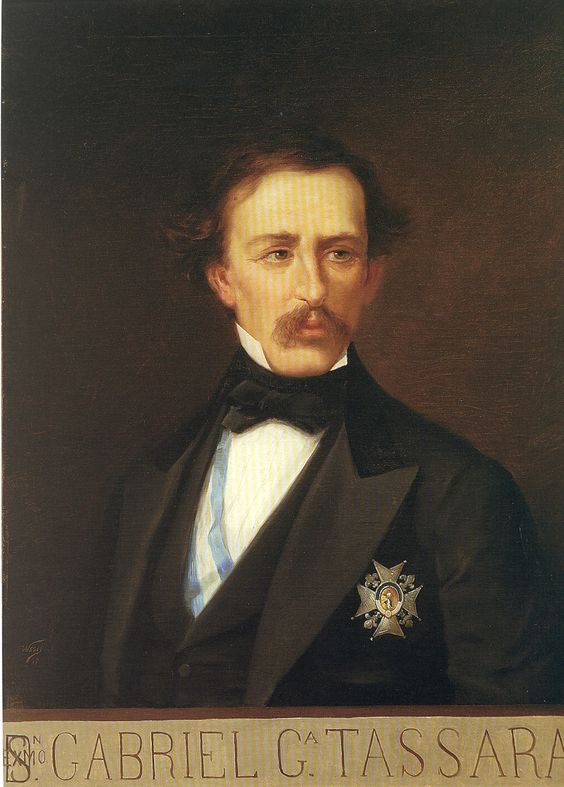
Gabriel García Tassara, the Spanish ambassador in Washington, D.C. during the American Civil War

During the American Civil War, the Kingdom of Spain was the target of intense diplomatic efforts by representatives of the United States and the Confederate States of America. At the start of the war, both sides believed that Spain was the likeliest European country to recognize the Confederacy, due to having poor relations with the United States long before Secession, and the persistence of slavery in Spanish Cuba and Puerto Rico. For her part, Spain appreciated that a successful rebellion would reduce American expansionism and allow the recovery of Spanish influence in Hispanic America, but she was reluctant to intervene unilaterally because of long-standing policies of cooperation with Great Britain and France, along with avoiding conflict with the United States. Spain discussed the possibility of diplomatic recognition with her allies, and recognized Confederate belligerency from June 17, 1861, allowing Confederate warships to use Spanish ports. Cuba was also an important base for blockade runners in the American Civil War, most of which were owned and crewed by British citizens.

== Background ==
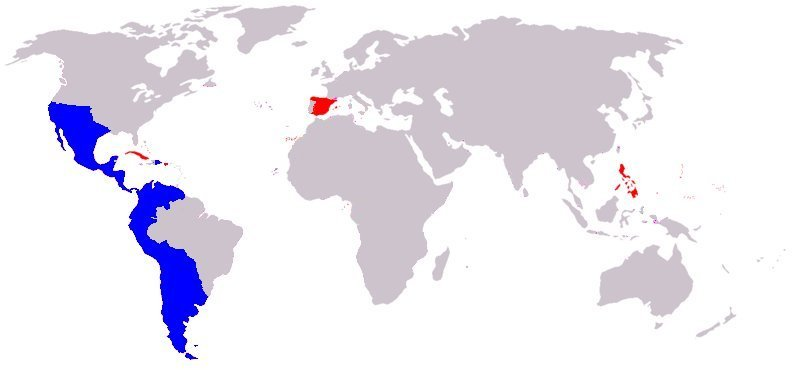
Spanish territories (red) and countries that became independent from Spain (blue) in the first half of the 19th century

Spain-United States relations were poor long before the war. The US supported the Spanish American wars of independence and created the Monroe Doctrine mainly as a deterrent to Spain regaining its lost colonies, while Spain protested the Mexican-American War as unfair. Furthermore, as relations between Northern and Southern states deteriorated in the 1850s, Southerners insisted on acquiring Cuba as a slave territory that would tip the slave-free state balance in their favor, by war if necessary. Northerners opposed the acquisition for the same reason, but many, including Abraham Lincoln believed it inevitable. However, as the Spanish economy industrialized and grew after the First Carlist War, Spain expanded and modernized its navy with the main aim of defending Cuba from the United States. By 1860, the Spanish Navy was the fourth most powerful in the world, surpassing the US Navy in total firepower and displacement, though not in ship numbers.

At the beginning of the Civil War, the Spanish government declared neutrality. Spain was aware of Southern ambitions in Cuba, but also appreciated that a breakaway South would be weaker than the intact United States. Even more important was Spain's commitment to good relations with Britain and France: if both recognized the CSA and joined the war, Spain would follow, but if neither or only one did, Spain would not. Public opinion mainly ignored the war for those in Mexico and the Dominican Republic, but many aristocrats, military leaders, slave-owning criollos, and Cuban traders favored the Confederacy. Support for the Union gained some traction among middle and lower classes and in the ruling Liberal Union party, particularly after the passing of the Emancipation Proclamation.

Both Southern and Northern American politicians dismissed Spain as backwards culturally and politically, as well as decadent. However, once war began, the same prejudice of Spain as a reactionary power and natural enemy of the United States made both sides assume that she was a natural ally of the Confederacy, and should be courted more vigorously than even Britain and France. A rare Hispanophile before the war was J. Johnston Pettigrew, who visited Spain in 1859 and wrote on the similarities he found between Spanish and Southern culture.

== Diplomacy ==
=== Relations with the Confederacy ===
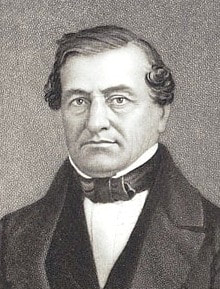
Pierre Adolphe Rost

Pierre Adolphe Rost was appointed Confederate commissioner to Madrid. In March 1861, foreign minister Saturnino Calderón Collantes met unofficially with Rost and told him that Spain would not initiate recognition on its own, but that he didn't rule it out in concert with other powers and with approval of France and Britain. Afterward, Calderón refused to meet any representative of the Confederacy unless the war turned clearly in the South's favor. Recognition was discussed with France and Britain, but never in the presence of Confederate agents. On 17 June 1861, Spain recognized Confederate belligerency and allowed their ships to use Spanish ports. Though not the first country to do this, the instant boost that Cuban ports gave to Confederate trade made Spain the target of attacks in the Union press, which labeled her "the only friend of the rebels". Spain would not withdraw its recognition of Confederate belligerency until 5 June 1865, six days after France and three after Britain.

Spain had two consuls in Confederate territory at the beginning of the war: one in New Orleans and another in Pensacola, both former Spanish colonial cities that retained strong commercial ties to Cuba. These officers were instructed to report on what was happening in the area, but to avoid any official contact with Confederate officials appointed by Richmond, and to continue serving the local Spanish communities in normal consular ways.

In 1863, Judah P. Benjamin banned foreign residents from communicating with their diplomats in Washington, and all foreign diplomats were expelled from Confederate-held territory in October.

=== Relations with the Union ===
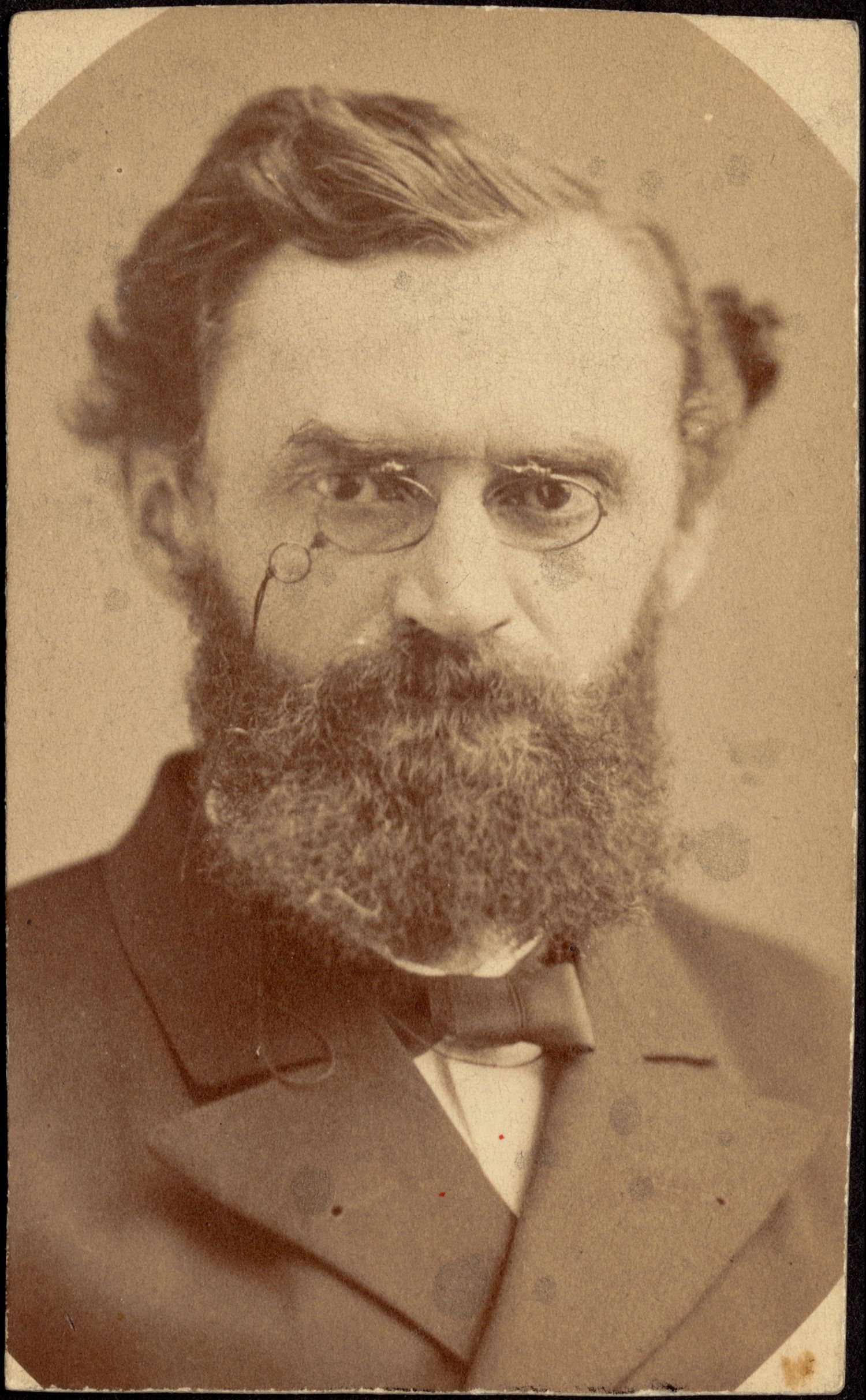
Carl Schurz

Lincoln first offered the position of minister to Spain to Cassius Marcellus Clay, who turned it down in favor of Russia. The nomination then fell to Carl Schurz, who was instructed to prevent Spanish recognition of the Confederacy, improve commercial ties, and remind Spain that it had been Southerners who wanted to annex Cuba before the war. The election of Schurz -- an abolitionist, antimonarchist, and veteran of the German revolutions of 1848–1849 -- was protested by the Spanish minister to Washington Gabriel García Tassara, and the fact that he had been proposed for, and rejected already by Portugal and Brazil was considered a snub by Spain. Schurz himself believed that the Spanish ministry was the most important after Mexico, but he despised the country, and resigned after he warned for several months that Spain would soon recognize the Confederacy. After returning to the States, Schurz reiterated his belief that Spain, France, and Britain would recognize the Confederacy soon, unless the Union won decisive battles and pushed for total emancipation in rebel and loyalist states. His provisional replacement was Horatio J. Perry, the American charge d'affairs and husband of Spanish poetess Carolina Coronado. Coronado negotiated with the Spanish royal family in private and, through a series of widely published poems, promoted the aims of the Lincoln administration, especially the abolition of slavery.

In 1862, the military governor of occupied New Orleans, Benjamin Butler, seized specie from the Spanish consulate and other European legations in the city under the pretext that they were purchasing weapons for the Confederates. Following the protest of Spain and other countries, Butler was recalled and all confiscated items were returned.

=== Proposed European mediation ===
Spain supported French proposals to mediate in the conflict in 1862 and 1863, but allowed France to take the lead. In June 1863, a few months after the House of Commons voted against recognizing the Confederacy, France extracted from Spain a plea that she would recognize the CSA if France did it first, regardless of British stance. However, emperor Napoleon III soon became uninterested in the American Civil War due to the lack of decisive Confederate victories and the beginning of the January Uprising and the Second Schleswig War in Europe.

== Naval policy ==
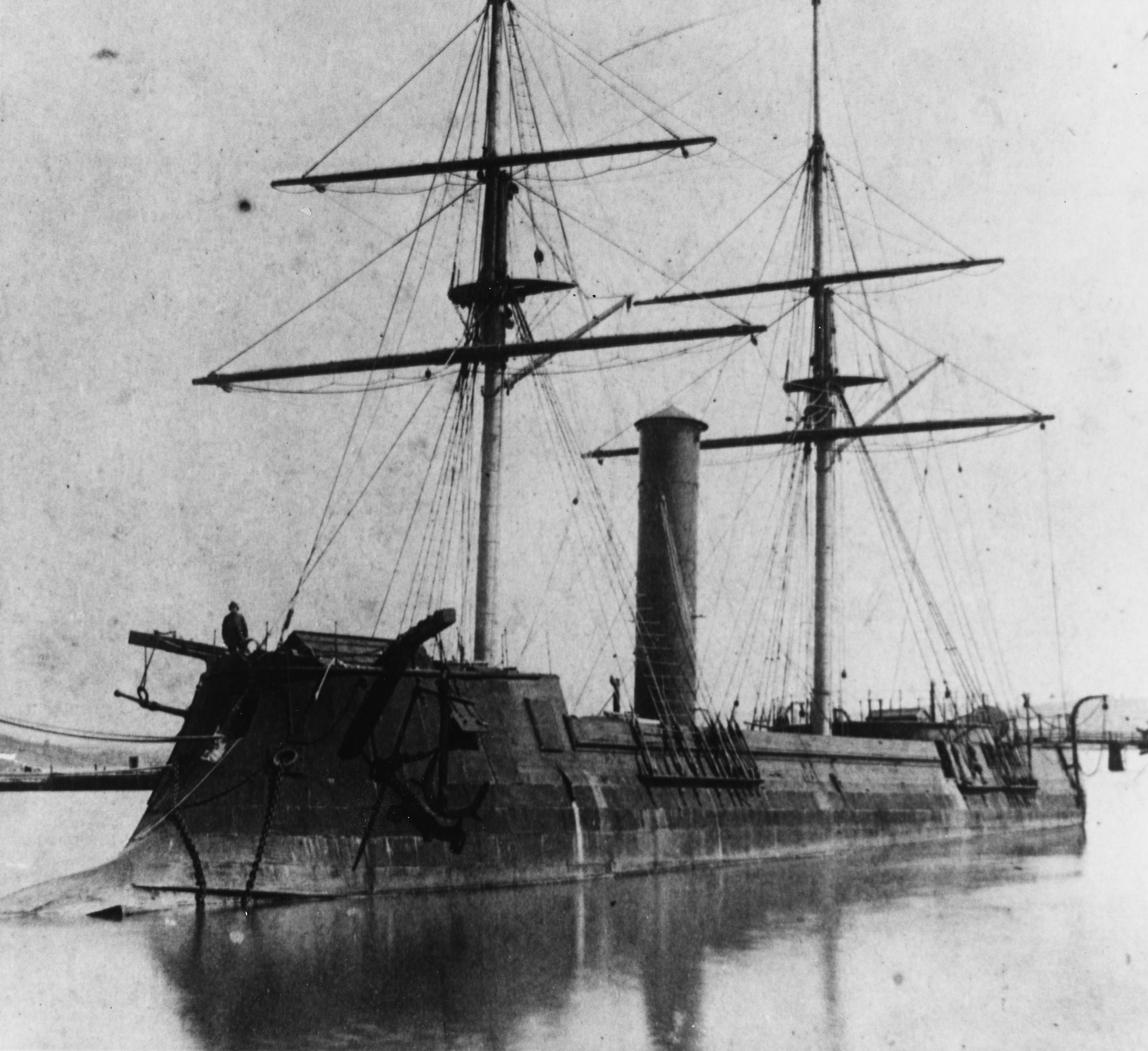
CSS Stonewall in 1865

Spain and the Union disagreed over the extent of Spanish national waters around Cuba, with Spain claiming six miles and the Union three. When asked in private by Seward, the secretary of the navy, Gideon Welles argued that the three-mile limit was essential to isolate Florida, but that the Union might have to agree to the six miles to comply with international law.

Several naval incidents happened as Union Navy ships entered Cuban waters to chase commercial vessels that left Florida ports for Cuba or vice versa, sometimes causing blockade runners to run aground on Cuba's shore, which led Spain to protest diplomatically and dispatch vessels to patrol Cuban waters. For the most part, however, the Union Navy steered clear from Cuban and Dominican waters, and the Spanish kept their own ships away from US waters. The Spanish government rejected Tassara's petitions in April 1862 and late June 1863 (when he believed that the fall of Washington, D.C. was imminent) to send warships up the Potomac River, to protect the Spanish legation and evacuate it if necessary.

Spain allowed the US Navy to contract for a coaling station near Cádiz. Seward offered the same deal for the Spanish Navy on US soil, but Spain did not pursue it. On January 4, 1862, strong US diplomatic and naval presence in Cádiz forced the damaged CSS Sumter to leave port within 48 hours and take refuge in Gibraltar, where it was sold to the British, repaired, and reused as a blockade runner. In January 1863, CSS Alabama docked in Santo Domingo without incident, but CSS Florida doing the same in Cuba engendered US protests in Havana and Madrid due to the courtesy not being extended to USS Massachusetts two days later.

The most controversial incident happened near the end of the war, when the ironclad CSS Stonewall, unable to sail except in calm seas, docked at Ferrol between 3 February and 24 March 1865, well past the 48-hours allowed per Spain's recognition of Confederate belligerency. From here, the Stonewall proceeded to Lisbon and then to Havana, followed by two Union warships that were unable to pierce the Confederate ship's armor. On 19 May, the Stonewall was sold for $16,000 to the Spanish colonial authorities, who resold it to the United States for the same sum in July.

== Military observers and weapons trade ==
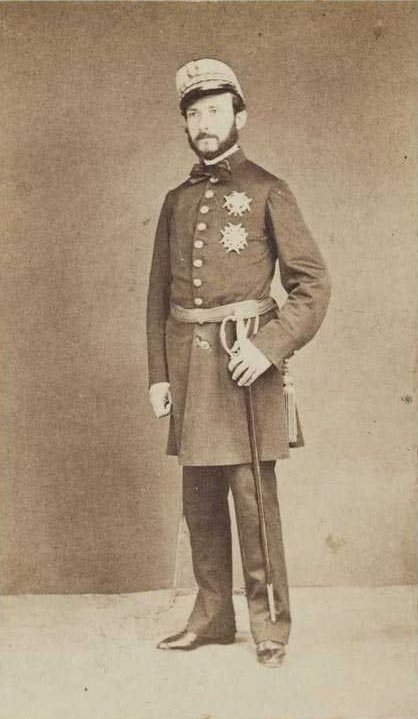
Juan Prim at the time of the American Civil War

During the war, the Union granted Spanish representatives unprecedented access to weapons, armies, and military installations. This was a calculated move to dissuade Spain from siding with the Confederacy by showing her the military strength of the Union, all while presenting an outwardly friendly face rather than hostile.

In the spring of 1861, the Union hosted a delegation of Spanish artillery officers investigating weapons purchases for the garrisons of Cuba and Puerto Rico. Though no purchase was made in the end, this helped build positive relations between the two countries. In 1862, general Juan Prim met Lincoln and William H. Seward in the White House while on his way back from refusing to join the Second French Intervention in Mexico. Prim also observed the Army of the Potomac ahead of the Battle of Richmond and visited a prison in Philadelphia. Back in Spain, Prim warned of the size and quality of the Union Army and its readiness to enforce the Monroe Doctrine, in a veiled but public criticism of queen Isabella II's desire to hold onto Santo Domingo and support the French-installed Second Mexican Empire. Afterward, Prim evolved to more liberal ideals that culminated with him leading the deposition of Isabella II in the 1868 Glorious Revolution.

On 8 May 1863, the Spanish purchased four steam gunboats from US shipyards. From the same year, Tassara, military attachés, and other Spanish agents were shown the USS Monitor and other ironclads that caused great impressions. Tassara reflected that Spain's wooden fleet was useless against such ships despite its own ongoing naval buildup.

The military attaché in Washington, Valeriano Weyler, possibly studied William Tecumseh Sherman's scorched earth tactics and later applied the lessons as captain-general during the Cuban War of Independence, though the evidence is inconclusive.

== Overseas territories ==
=== Santo Domingo ===
On 18 March 1861, Dominican president Pedro Santana announced the return of his country to Spanish sovereignty after a fraudulent plebiscite. Despite negotiating with Santana, Spain did not expect this to happen so soon, and Isabella II did not ratify the annexation until 19 May, after the Civil War had begun and it was clear that the United States would not intervene. Seward raised the option of war with Spain, but Lincoln only protested, as did Haiti and other Latin American countries.

Despite Dominican overtures, the Union refused to arm the Dominican resistance or recognize the Second Dominican Republic. After the Dominican Restoration War broke out in 1863, Tassara commented that the Union remained strictly neutral.

From the period of Haitian rule and until 1860, Santo Domingo was a destination for African Americans wishing to leave the United States, especially those with knowledge in agriculture. The Civil War interrupted this flow. Following the Emancipation Proclamation, the Lincoln administration contacted Spain to allow the settlement of freedmen in Santo Domingo, but this was rejected by the Spanish as a potential source of instability. In an example of Blanqueamiento, the Spanish government studied bringing in white cotton farmers from the Southern United States instead, who would increase the colony's racial difference with Haiti and were expected to be more sympathetic to Spanish rule. The Restoration War prevented this.

Spain made progress against the Dominicans in 1864, but Lincoln's reelection convinced the government that the Union's victory was a fait accompli and US intervention in Santo Domingo would follow. The Spanish withdrawal was announced on 1 May 1865 and completed on 11 July.

=== Cuba ===
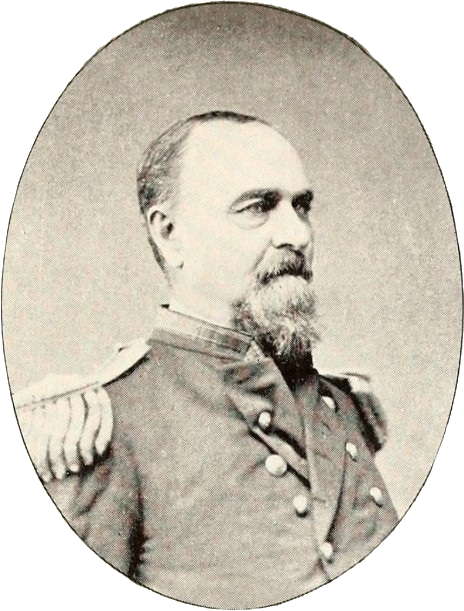
Robert W. Shufeldt

In July 1861, Robert M. T. Hunter appointed Charles J. Helm Confederate emissary, to Havana. Helm met several times with captain-general Francisco Serrano, triggering protests by US consul-general Robert Wilson Shufeldt and a demand for an explanation by the Lincoln administration. Helm told Serrano that the CSA wished to be a close collaborator of Spain and was willing to abandon all claims to Cuba, recognize the annexation of Santo Domingo, and begin negotiations toward a defensive alliance; he said Spain should worry about the Union trying to seize Cuba, not the Confederacy. Meanwhile, Shufeldt angered Serrano by reminding him that the Union Navy had left Spanish shipping alone around Cuba, despite being aware of the presence of blockade runners and a powerful US flotilla pursuing them. Serrano told both parties that Spain was committed to neutrality, and that any change would come from Madrid, not Havana.

In Cuba, the Confederates traded mainly cotton for medical supplies, food, cigars, machinery, clothing, and shoes from Spanish military surplus, which were imported through the ports of New Orleans, Mobile, and Pensacola. The exact volume of trade is unknown because it was not properly recorded to maintain plausible deniability if necessary. The exception was the sale of weapons and ammunition, which was sought by Confederate traders but banned by Spanish authorities, both to comply with neutrality and (later on) to keep the Spanish forces in the Dominican Restoration War adequately supplied. However, some weapons were still smuggled successfully to Florida. This trade continued until the Union took New Orleans and Mobile and successfully closed most of the Florida coastline by mid 1863.

Spain allowed a handful of Confederate leaders and their families to take refuge in Cuba after the war, including John C. Breckinridge, who had ironically campaigned for acquiring Cuba in the 1860 United States presidential election. Despite US protests, the Spanish allowed Breckinridge to leave for Great Britain, where he remained until a federal amnesty allowed him to return in 1869.

== Slavery ==
By the beginning of the war, slavery had been abolished in all Spanish territories except Cuba and Puerto Rico, and the agreement to annex the Dominican Republic specified that it would not be reintroduced in its territory. Abolitionism met much less opposition in Puerto Rico, where traditional low-scale slavery remained and slave importation had de facto ended in the 1850s, than in Cuba, where profitable large scale plantation slavery expanded in the early 19th century. Most slaves in the history of Cuba, between 700,000 and one million, were imported between 1790 and 1867. Slave numbers also fell in Puerto Rico because of their traffic to Cuba.

Spain abolished the slave trade in 1845, but this was rarely enforced. Following the Lyons-Seward Treaty, the United Kingdom and the United States pressured Spain to make the ban real. In the spring of 1862, the United States and Spain collaborated to apprehend a suspected US slave ship, the Southern-based Falmouth, in Cádiz harbor. Spanish authorities reported that the US consul in Cádiz, E. S. Eggleston, was uncooperative and suspected that he was involved in the trade himself or bribed by slavers. Though Eggleston could not be punished due to his personal connections to Seward, Perry reprehended him. From the weeks after the end of the war and through 1865 and 1866, there were persistent reports and rumors of slave smuggling from Florida to Cuba, which worried American and Spanish authorities alike. It is estimated that between 40 and 200 slaves were successfully taken to the island. The United States renewed diplomatic pressure on Spain to abolish slavery, but this was received with skepticism by Spanish officials, who believed it a cover to promote separatism in the colonies because many independence supporters were also abolitionists.

In Spain, the Emancipation Proclamation and the Union's victory themselves pushed more politicians to campaign for the abolition of slavery in the Antilles. Lincoln in particular was lionized as a slave liberator and republican icon by Spanish progressives, who gave little importance to his role in keeping the United States together. In 1865, the Spanish Abolitionist Society was founded by Spaniards and Puerto Ricans in Madrid. The slave trade was banned again, this time specifically for Cuba, in 1867, but further discussion on slavery was put on hold after the outbreak of the Ten Years' War in 1868. From 1870 slavery was gradually abolished until it was banned completely in 1873 in Puerto Rico, and 1886 in Cuba.

== Volunteers ==
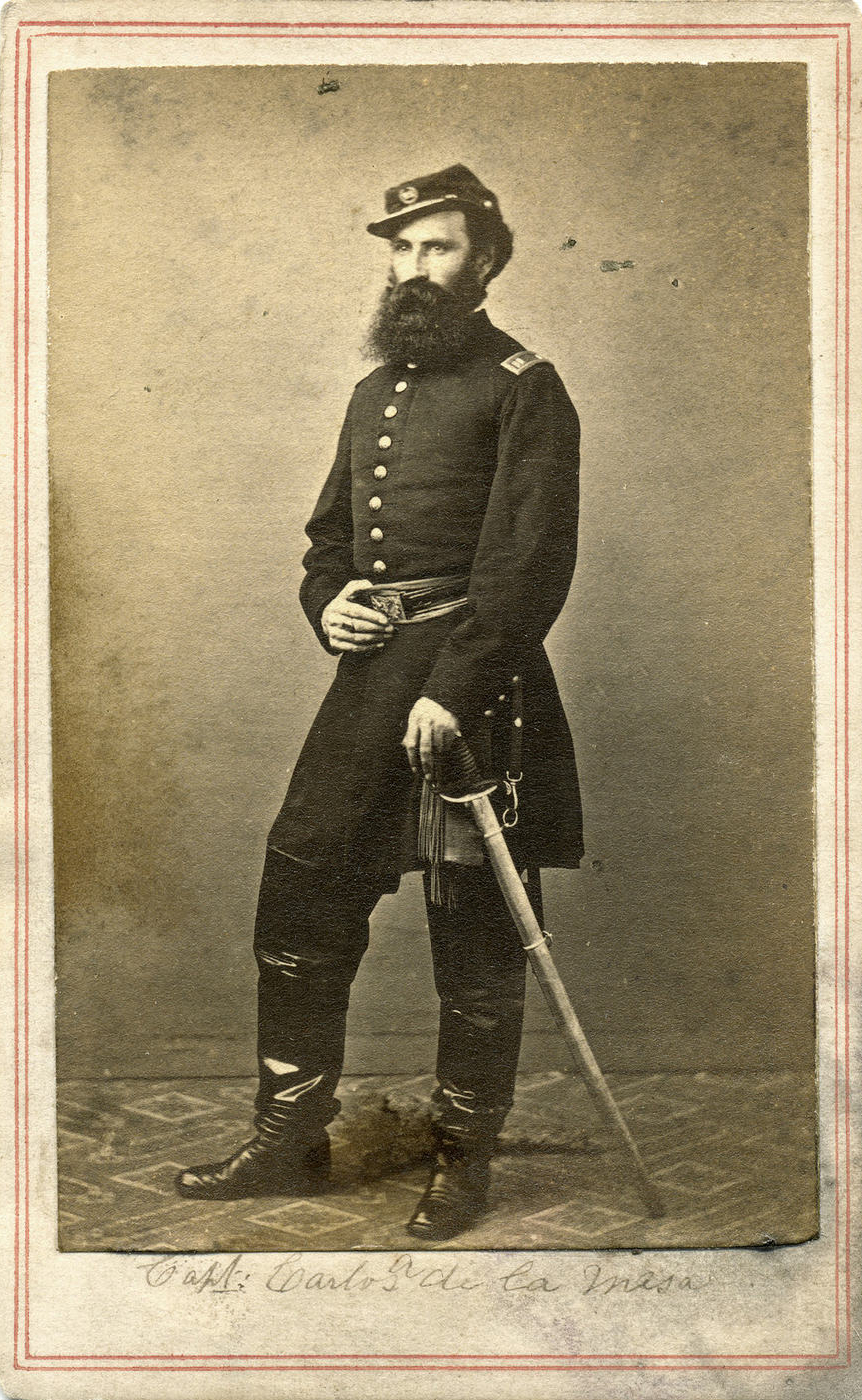
Captain Carlos Álvarez de la Mesa, 39th Infantry Regiment, native of Madrid and grandfather of Major General Terry de la Mesa Allen Sr.

=== For the Union ===
The 39th New York Infantry Regiment of the Union Army, made of European immigrants, included a "Spanish-Portuguese Company" of volunteers from the Iberian Peninsula. One of its Spanish members, Francisco Navarrete, captured a Confederate flag at the Battle of Gettysburg. Though this feat was usually rewarded with a medal, Navarrete did not receive any, for unknown reasons.

Other Union commanders with family connections to Spain include Major General George Meade, born in Cádiz to a Philadelphia merchant family, who lived there until he was thirteen years old. The first Admiral of the US Navy, David Farragut, was the son of Jordi Ferragut, an American Revolutionary War naval officer from Minorca, which was disputed at the time between Britain and Spain. Luis F. Emilio, another son of a Spanish immigrant, was a Captain in the 54th Massachusetts Infantry Regiment and the author of Brave Black Regiment (1891), one of the bases of the Civil War film Glory.

=== For the Confederacy ===
The presence of "Spanish" soldiers in the 13th Louisiana Infantry Regiment of the Confederate States Army is recorded, but all individual information about its members is lost. The 10th Louisiana Infantry Regiment included at least twenty Spaniards resident in New Orleans. Almost all saw action in Pennsylvania and Virginia, including at Gettysburg against the 39th New York Infantry.

These Peninsulares in the Confederate forces were dwarfed by seventy Cuban volunteers resident in New Orleans alone, plus many others from Florida, Georgia, and South Carolina, where they rose to the highest ranks of lieutenant colonel and colonel. The Cuban exile Ambrosio José Gonzales, who supported the annexation of Cuba to the United States before the war, was responsible for logistics and artillery in the Confederate forces, including coastal defenses, and was chief of artillery for P. G. T. Beauregard. Gonzales ran afoul of Confederate president Jefferson Davis and was denied a promotion to general despite his merits exceeding those of others that attained the position. Another Cuban annexationist, José Agustín Quintero, acted as Confederate envoy to Santiago Vidaurri, the Mexican governor of Nuevo León and Coahuila.

== See also ==
- Diplomacy of the American Civil War
- Spain and the American Revolutionary War
- Reign of Isabella II
- Spanish-American War
