= José Quintero (disambiguation) =

José Quintero (1924–1999) was a Panamanian theatre director and producer.

Jose Quintero may also refer to:

- José Agustín Quintero (1829–1885), journalist, lawyer, poet, and revolutionary
- José Humberto Quintero Parra (1902–1984), Roman Catholic cardinal
- José Quintero (footballer) (born 1990), Ecuadorian footballer
- José Quintero (fencer) (born 1996), Venezuelan fencer
