= Diego de Gardoqui =

Spanish politician and diplomat

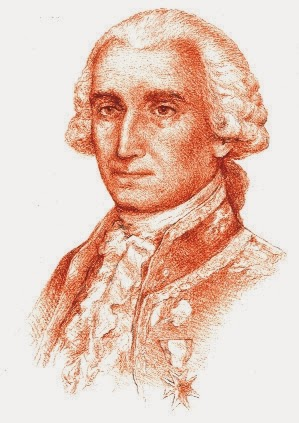
Modern portrait illustration of Diego de Gardoqui by an unknown artist.

Diego María de Gardoqui y Arriquibar (born November 12, 1735, Bilbao, Spain – d. 1798, Turin, Italy) was a Spanish politician and Spain's first envoy to the United States.

== Biography, origins, and youth ==
Member of a family of Basque councilors, among them Martín Gardoqui and John Gardoqui, also common ancestors of the governor Luis de Unzaga, whose grandfather was the Bilbao councilor Thomas de Unzaga Gardoqui; This family saga was dedicated for upcoming generations to business, especially to commerce and the incipient metallurgical industry related to the Navy shipyards.

He married Brígida Josefa de Orueta y Uriarte on December 6, 1765, in Vitoria, Spain.

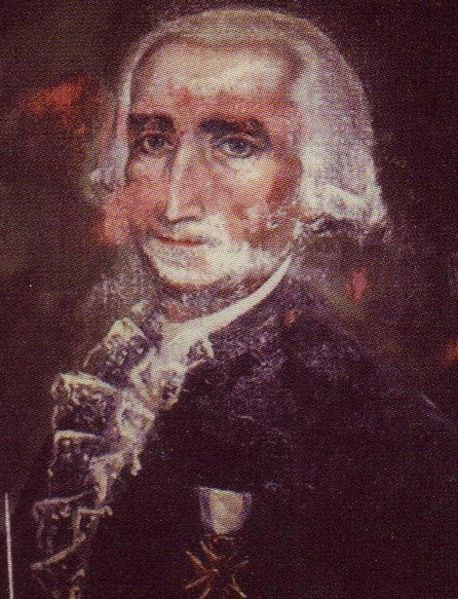
Portrait of Gardoqui, ca. 1750, by an unknown artist, in the collection of the Palace of the Governors, Santa Fe, New Mexico.

Diego de Gardoqui, the fourth of eight children, was the financial intermediary between the Spanish Court and the Colonies during the American Revolutionary War, meeting with John Jay on various occasions. He was a Basque and a member of the wealthy Gardoqui family of Bilbao, Spain. The mercantile business of "José de Gardoqui e Hijos" in Bilbao (of which Diego was one of three sons in a partnership with their father) supplied the patriots with war supplies during the war.

In November 1775, Gardoqui supplied the Massachusetts troops with 300 muskets with bayonets. They were the earliest foreign-supplied arms to arrive for the American patriots. The trading firm Joseph Gardoqui and Sons supplied Spanish blankets, tents, boots, and uniforms that helped keep hundreds of Continental Army soldiers warm through the brutal winter of 1777 at Valley Forge.

After the Revolution he became Spain's first envoy to the United States. He arrived in New York in the Spring of 1785. In the summer of 1786, he and Jay, who was Secretary for Foreign Affairs under the Articles of Confederation, worked up a treaty in which the United States would receive a commercial treaty with Spain in exchange for giving up its claims to free navigation of the Mississippi. Although Jay backed the treaty, Congress never ratified it.

Gardoqui continued as Spain's Minister to the United States until he returned to Bilbao in October, 1789. He attended George Washington's inaugural address and pronounced it "an eloquent and appropriate address." In honor of the inauguration, Gardoqui decorated the front of his house on Broadway in New York City, near Bowling Green, "with two magnificent transparent gardens, adorned with statues, natural size, imitating marble.... There were also various flower-pots, different arches with foliage and columns of imitation marble, and on the sky of these gardens were placed thirteen stars, representing the United States of America—two of which stars showed opaque, to designate the two States which had not adopted the Constitution."

In the early years after the Revolutionary War when Congress and Washington resided in New York City, Gardoqui's house was also the meeting place of the first Catholic dignitaries representing their countries. There Mass was said for the congregation composed of such men as representatives of France, Spain, and Portugal, as well as Charles Carroll, his cousin Daniel, and Thomas Fitzsimmons, Catholic members of Congress, officers and soldiers of the foreign contingent, merchants and others. Diego de Gardoqui laid the cornerstone of St. Peter's, the first permanent structure for a Catholic church erected in the State of New York, on October 5, 1785. The church first opened on November 4, 1786.

Because Spain was in control of the Louisiana Territory, Gardoqui worked to protect the King's interests on the Mississippi River. Various factions in Kentucky were frustrated with congress' refusal to allow them statehood. Gardoqui worked with John Brown and General James Wilkinson in 1788 to procure a treaty between Kentucky and Spain concerning navigation on the River. In the end, Kentucky joined the United States and there was no separate treaty. Gardoqui also worked with Colonel George Morgan and Benjamin Harrison in 1788 and 1789. They had been attempting to buy land in Illinois from the United States government with no success. Morgan and Gardoqui worked out an agreement whereby 15,000,000 acres (61,000 km^{2}) west of the Mississippi, south from its junction with the Ohio, and north of the St. Francis River would be deeded to American settlers. Morgan was to be the commander of the colony, subject to the king of Spain. Settlers would have religious freedom and some degree of autonomy. The new colony was to be called "New Madrid." However, the Spanish governor at New Orleans, although somewhat in favor of the project, refused to allow self-government and required that all settlers be Catholic, and the settlement never saw fruition as a Spanish colony.

George Washington said of Gardoqui on August 10, 1790, "... no man in his most Catholic Majesty's dominions could be more acceptable to the Inhabitants of these States." Gardoqui gave Washington a four-volume edition in the original Spanish of Don Quixote as a present. The set of volumes still exists and is preserved at Washington's personal library, which opened as a museum on September 27, 2013.

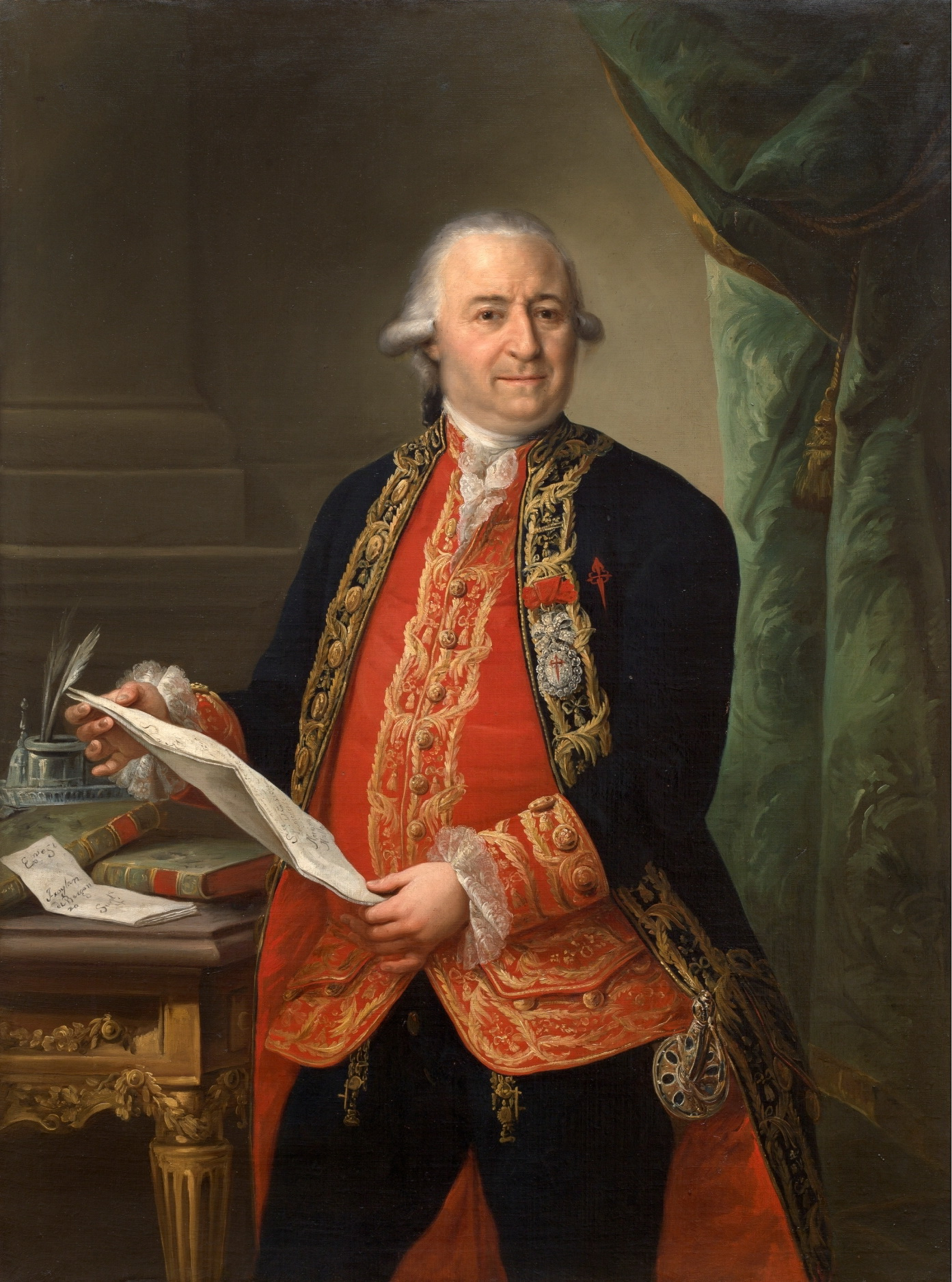
Portrait of Spanish count Pedro López de Lerena in about 1791 by Mariano Salvador Maella.

Gardoqui served under the Bourbon kings Charles III of Spain and Charles IV of Spain. Gardoqui, as a Spanish diplomat, operated under the ministry of José Moñino, 1st Count of Floridablanca. He became Finance Minister in 1791, when Minister Pedro López de Lerena, Count of Lerena, suffered a debilitating illness. Gardoqui was officially named Finance Minister after the death of Count de Lerena, in 1792.

Gardoqui was the Spanish counterparty to the Jay–Gardoqui Treaty of 1789, negotiated by John Jay of the United States, relating to the navigational rights of Spain in the Mississippi River. Gardoqui, in 1785–86, had arranged for a Spanish horse to be sent to Jay.

In 1785, Gardoqui laid the cornerstone of the first Catholic Church in New York City, St. Peter's on Barclay Street.

After Gardoqui returned to Spain in 1788, he was later succeeded in the United States by two diplomats, José de Jaudenes y Nebot and José Ignacio de Viar (serving as chargés d'affaires to the U.S.), both of whom had served on Gardoqui's own staff during his 1785–1788 tenure.

Gardoqui was elected to the American Philosophical Society in 1789.

== Tributes ==
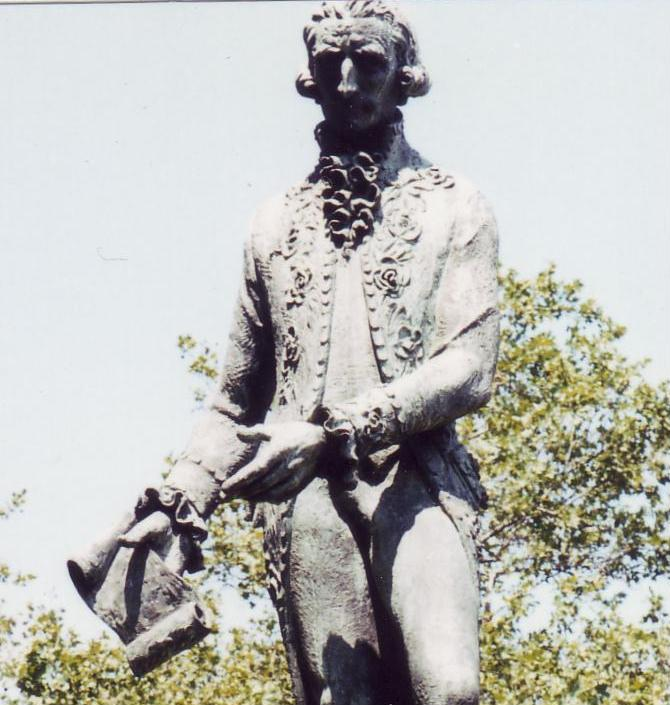
Philadelphia statue of Gardoqui by Luis Antonio Sanguino

There is a Calle Gardoqui in Bilbao, Spain, but it is named after his brother, Cardinal Francisco Gardoqui (1747–1820).

The city of Constitución, Chile, was originally named Nueva Bilbao de Gardoqui in his honor.

There was a World War II ship in the US Navy, the USS Gardoqui (IX-218), which honored the Gardoqui family of Bilbao, Spain. It, in turn, had been named for a US ship, the USS Gardoqui (1898), which had seen action in the Spanish–American War.

In 1977, the Spanish Crown, in commemoration of the United States Bicentennial, presented a statue of Don Diego de Gardoqui, crafted by Spanish artist Luis Antonio Sanguino (b. 1934, Barcelona, Spain), to the City of Philadelphia. The statue currently stands in Logan Square; in 2019, the statue was refurbished.
