= Jay–Gardoqui Treaty =

1786 proposed treaty between the US and Spain

The Jay–Gardoqui Treaty (also known as the Liberty Treaty with Spain) was a proposed 1786 treaty between the United States and Spain that was not ratified. It would have guaranteed Spanish exclusive right to navigate the Mississippi River for 25 years. It also opened Spain's European and West Indian ports to American shipping. However, the Treaty was opposed by Virginia leaders James Madison and James Monroe who secured its rejection by the Continental Congress.

With a weak central government that delegated most decisions to individual states, American foreign policy was disjointed. European powers looked at the new nation as a weakling, and tried to run roughshod over it. American nationalists realized the problem, and used the weakness in dealing with foreign powers as one of the reasons for installing a new constitution in 1789. Spain had numerous schemes to keep the new nation weak, including closing the Mississippi River to its traffic, and forming alliances with Indian tribes along its southern border.

On the other hand, Spanish merchants welcomed trade with the new nation, which had been impossible when it was a British colony. Madrid therefore encouraged the United States to set up consulates in Spain's New World colonies. American merchants and Eastern cities likewise wanted to open trade with the Spanish colonies which had been forbidden before 1775. A new line of commerce involved American merchants importing goods from Britain, and then reselling them to the Spanish colonies.

When Spain closed the port of New Orleans to American commerce in 1784, Congress sent John Jay to Madrid to achieve terms to open the Mississippi to Americans. Gardoqui, however, arrived in New York in June 1785 and Spanish-American treaty negotiations began soon after. A year's worth of diplomacy resulted in the ambassadors signing an agreement that ignored the problem of the Mississippi in exchange for commercial advantages benefiting the Northeast (the Jay–Gardoqui Treaty). Congress rejected the treaty, and the issue smoldered for ten more years. Congress also claimed lands in the west still occupied by the British and Spaniards, but could not forcefully challenge those nations for control of the land.

== See also ==
- Timeline of United States diplomatic history
- List of treaties
- Diego de Gardoqui
