= USS Gardoqui =

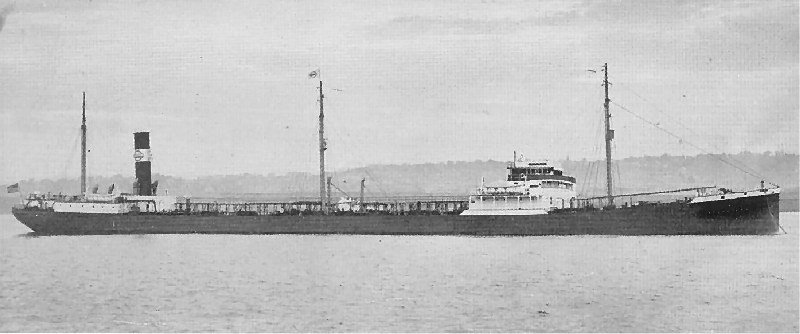
- USS Gardoqui; USS Gardoqui (IX-218)

History

United States
- Name: Gardoqui
- Builder: Federal Shipbuilding and Drydock Company
- Laid down: 1921
- Launched: 17 May 1921
- Commissioned: 23 June 1945
- Decommissioned: 13 February 1946
- Stricken: 12 April 1946
- Fate: Sold to her previous owner, scrapped 1947

General characteristics
- Type: Tanker
- Displacement: 15,665 tons
- Length: 510 ft 6 in (155.60 m)
- Beam: 68 ft (21 m)
- Speed: 10 knots
- Complement: 70 officers and men

USS Gardoqui (IX-218), an unclassified miscellaneous vessel, was the only ship of the United States Navy to be named for USS Gardoqui, a Spanish gunboat captured during the Spanish–American War. Her name was misspelled when she was christened. Gardoqui was named for the commercial house of Joseph Gardoqui and Sons of Bilbao, Spain, which represented the American Colonies in the Spanish court during the American Revolution. Her keel was laid down in 1921 by the Federal Shipbuilding Company, in Kearny, New Jersey. She was acquired from the War Shipping Administration and commissioned at Pearl Harbor on 23 June 1945 with Lieutenant Harold L. Tysinger in command.

A tanker originally intended for use as Mobile Floating Storage, Gardoqui departed Pearl Harbor for Eniwetok 27 July 1945. Reaching her destination 12 August, she discharged her cargo of fuel and lube oil to navy and merchant ships for almost a month. Gardoqui departed Eniwetok 7 September and put in at Tokyo on 21 September to discharge more lube and fuel oil.

Departing Tokyo 7 November, she transited the Panama Canal via Pearl Harbor 28 December and came to anchor off Mobile, Alabama, on 6 January 1946. Gardoqui decommissioned at Mobile 13 February 1946 and was returned to the War Shipping Administration. Her name was struck from the Naval Vessel Register on 12 April 1946 and she was sold to her previous owner, E. T. Bedford, 28 January 1947 and scrapped later that year.
