= Gardoqui =

Notable Spanish family

Gardoqui is a wealthy Spanish family. A renowned member of this family was Don Diego de Gardoqui Arriquibar who was the first Ambassador of Spain to the United States and Spanish Finance Minister.

== Gardoqui family of Bilbao, Spain ==
Wealthy Basque proprietors of the 18th-Century House of José Gardoqui and Sons (la Casa de José Gardoqui e hijos) of Bilbao, Spain.

The most famous member of this family was Don Diego María de Gardoquí Arriquibar (1735–1798), who was the first Ambassador of Spain to the United States and Spanish Finance Minister in 1792, after the death of Don Pedro López de Lerena, Count of Lerena.

Spain made loans to the United States to be used to furnish war supplies through the House of Gardoqui.

There was a Catholic Cardinal in the family: Francisco Antonio Javier de Gardoqui Arriquíbar (1747–1820).

== See also ==
- Spain in the American Revolutionary War
