= José Agustín Quintero =

American journalist

- Born: May 6, 1829; Havana, Cuba
- Died: September 7, 1885 (aged 56); New Orleans, Louisiana
- Occupations: journalist, soldier, lawyer, and more
- Spouse: Eliza Quintero
- Children: Lamar Quintero, John Marshall Quintero
- Parent(s): Antonio Quintero, Anna Woodville

José Agustín Quintero Woodville (May 6, 1829 – September 7, 1885) was, among other things, a journalist, diplomat, lawyer, poet, translator, and revolutionary.

== Early life ==
Born in Havana to a Cuban tobacco planter named Antonio Quintero and an English woman named Anna Woodville, he studied at Colegio de San Cristóbal and reportedly at Harvard University at age 12, though no record of him there survives. Quintero was a friend of Henry Wadsworth Longfellow and translated his work and that of other poets such as Tennyson. He graduated from law school in Havana and became a journalist writing for Cuban patriot revolution. He was arrested by the Spanish three times for his writings and escaped from Cuba after being condemned to death.

== Move to the United States ==
In the 1850s he ran Democratic papers in the American South, and at the beginning of the American Civil War he took the side of the South. He enlisted in the Quitman Rifles guard of Austin, Texas and met Jefferson Davis in Richmond, Virginia, who sent him to Mexico as a spy for the South. Quintero had a large role in opening up trade at Matamoros and helped smuggle Southern cotton to Europe for materiel.

At the end of the Civil War, Quintero established himself in New Orleans, married, started a family, practiced law, and joined the New Orleans Picayune, for which he was an editor. He became the American Consul for Belgium and Costa Rica. By the time of his death on September 7, 1885, "in New Orleans no man was more widely known".
