= Soulard, St. Louis =

Neighborhood of St. Louis in Missouri, US

Coordinates: 38.6053°N 90.2086°W

Soulard
- Neighborhood of St. Louis
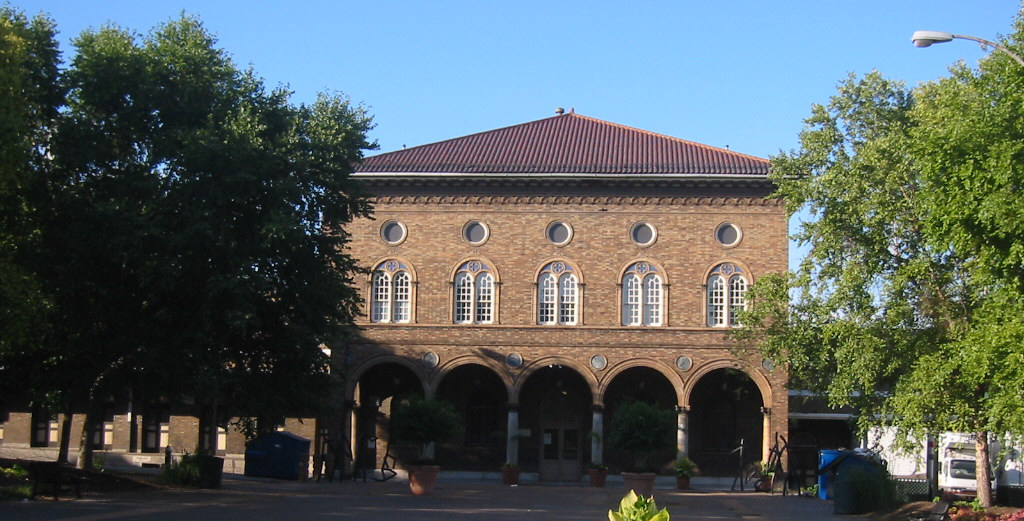
- The Soulard Market in the northern portion of the Soulard neighborhood.

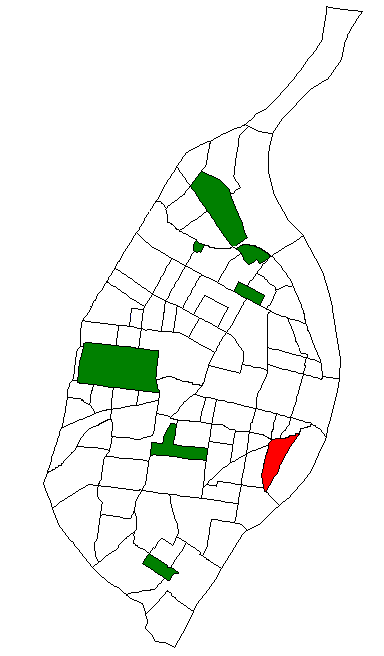
- Location (red) of Soulard within St. Louis
- Country: United States
- State: Missouri
- City: St. Louis
- Ward: 8

Government
  - Aldermen: Jami Cox Antwi

Area
  - Total: 0.60 sq mi (1.6 km^{2})

Population (2020)
  - Total: 3,831
  - Density: 6,400/sq mi (2,500/km^{2})
- ZIP code(s): Part of 63104
- Area code(s): 314
- Website: stlouis-mo.gov

Soulard (/ˈsulɑːrd/ SOO-lard) is a historic neighborhood in St. Louis, Missouri. It is the home of Soulard Farmers Market, the oldest farmers' market west of the Mississippi River. Soulard is one of eight certified local historic districts in the city of St. Louis.

== History ==
It is named for Antoine Soulard and Julia Cérre Soulard. Antoine Soulard first began to develop the land given to him by his father-in-law, Jean-Gabriel Cerré. Soulard was a surveyor for the Spanish government and a refugee from the French Revolution in the 1790s. It is home to several nineteenth century church buildings, including Trinity Lutheran.

== Present ==
One of the oldest communities in the city, Soulard is today a largely residential neighborhood whose many businesses include restaurants, bars, and the North American headquarters of Anheuser-Busch, which houses the St. Louis Brewery. The neighborhood is divided roughly by Lynch Street; north of which is mostly row homes and small apartments, and south of which is largely the Anheuser-Busch Brewery and headquarters. Many of its houses date to the mid- to late-19th century. Soulard also has several historic churches.

Many of its bars host live music, especially the blues and jazz bands for which the city is known. The barrelhouse blues piano player James Crutchfield lived in the neighborhood from 1984 until his death in 2001 and performed in many of the nightclubs. The district hosts regular pub crawls.

Various neighborhood groups, including the Soulard Restoration Group and the Soulard Business Association, organize events, keep the neighborhood clean and safe, and publish a newspaper, The Soulard Renaissance.

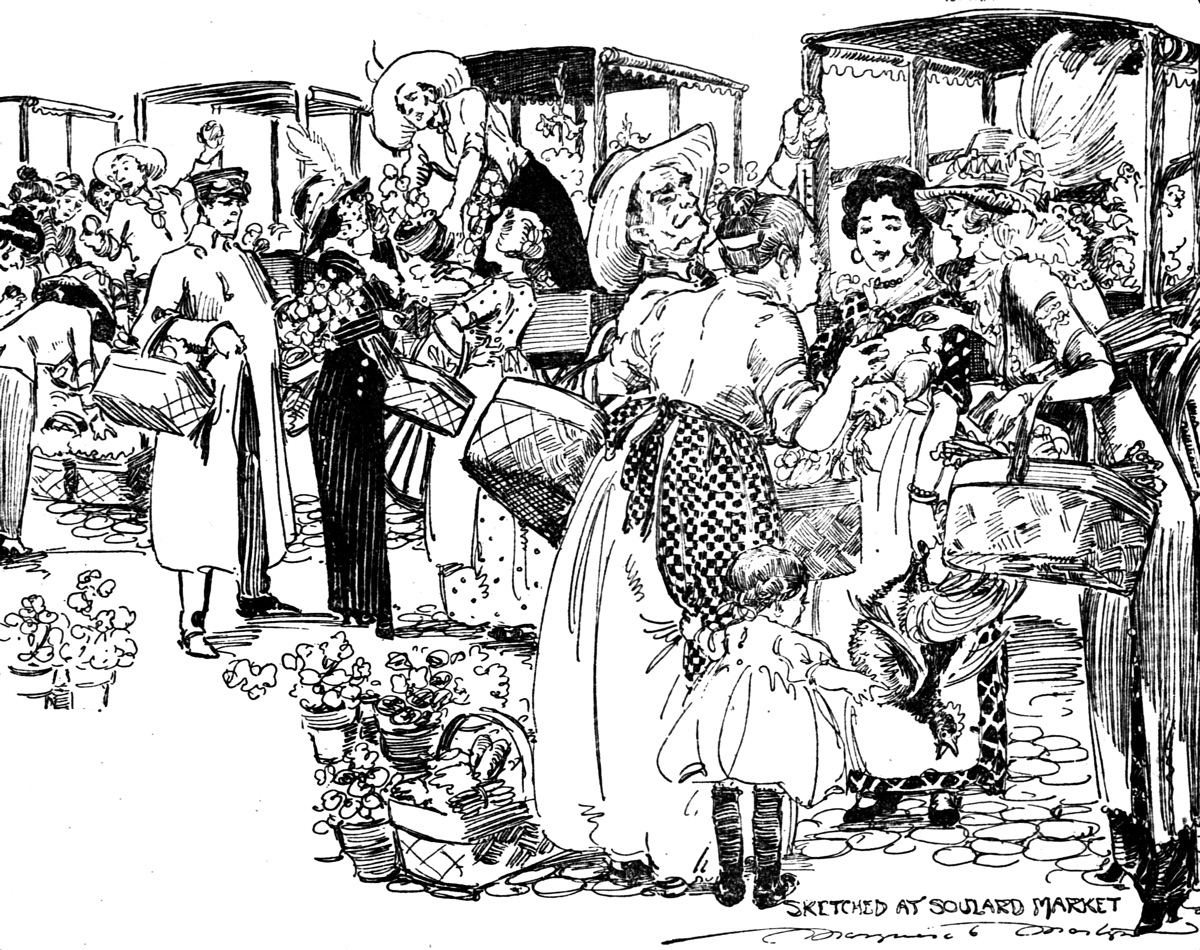
1921 drawing of Soulard Market by Marguerite Martyn

It is home to Soulard Farmers Market, the oldest farmers' market west of the Mississippi. More than a hundred vendors include farmers, produce vendors, meat shops, spice shops, florist shops, and food.

Soulard Market is featured in the opening scene of Alan Schroeder's picture book Ragtime Tumpie.

== Events ==
Soulard hosts many events throughout the year, including celebrations of Mardi Gras and Oktoberfest.

A neon sign commemorating Soulard Mardi Gras 2006

== Demographics ==
Historical population
Year	Pop.	±%
1990	3,771	—
2000	3,187	−15.5%
2010	3,440	+7.9%
2020	3,831	+11.4%

In 2020, Soulard's population was 75.2% White, 15.8% Black, 0.2% Native American, 1.1% Asian, 0% Pacific Islander, 1.5% from some other race, and 6.0% from two or more races. 4.3% of the population was of Hispanic origin.

== Gallery ==
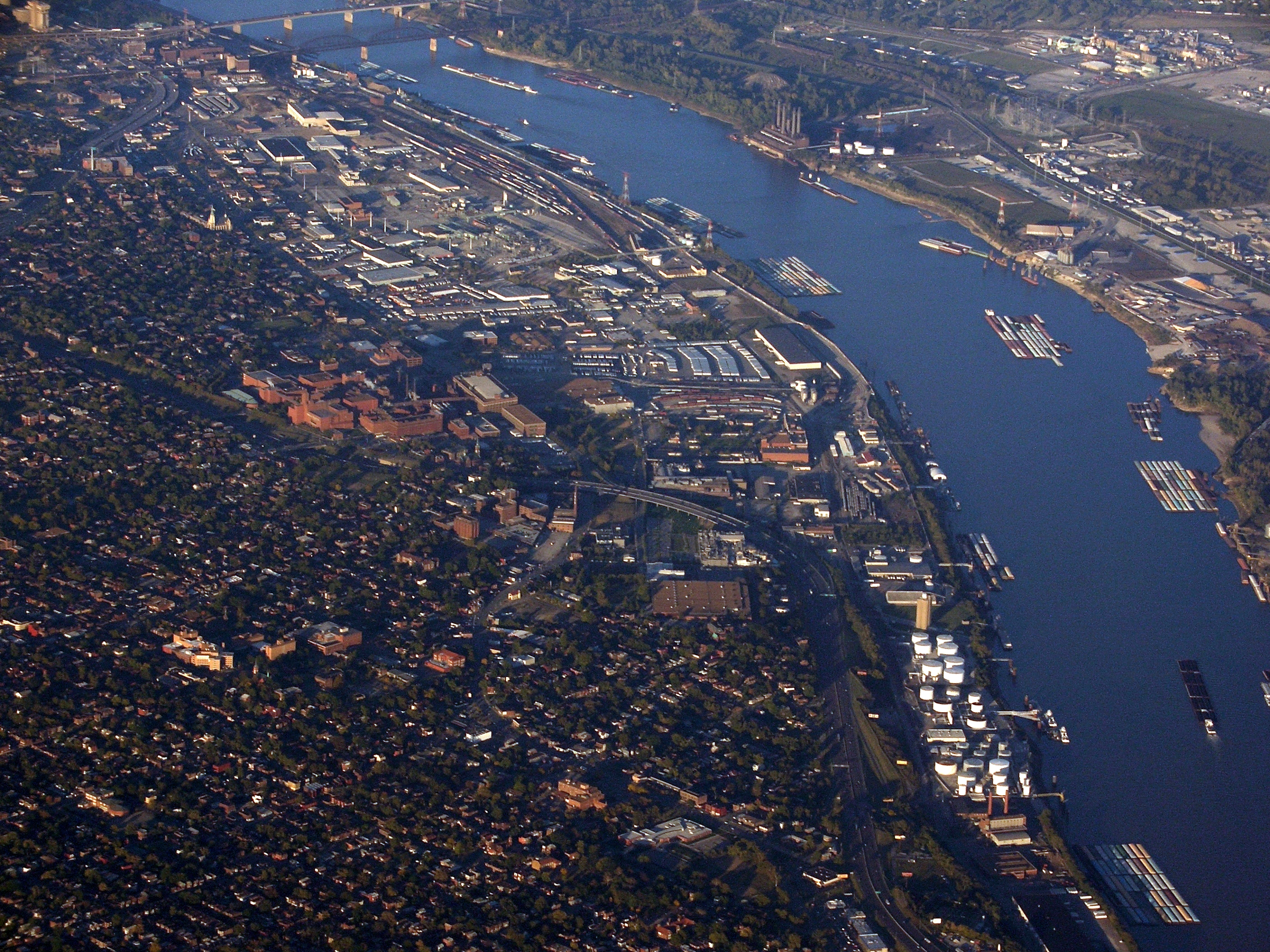
The Anheuser-Busch and Lemp brewery buildings and Soulard in south city near the Mississippi River, 2006

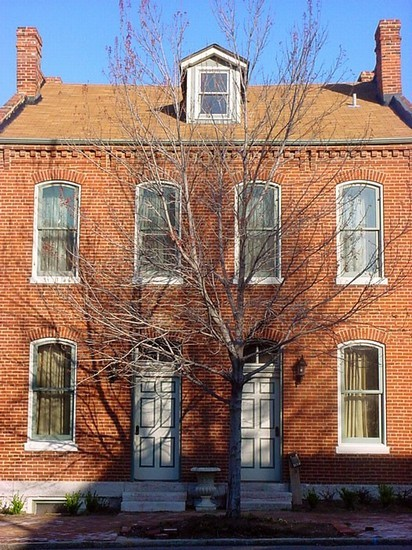
A two-family home in Soulard, around 2006

Stars are a common architectural motif from the era of Soulard's building, an anchor plate on brick.

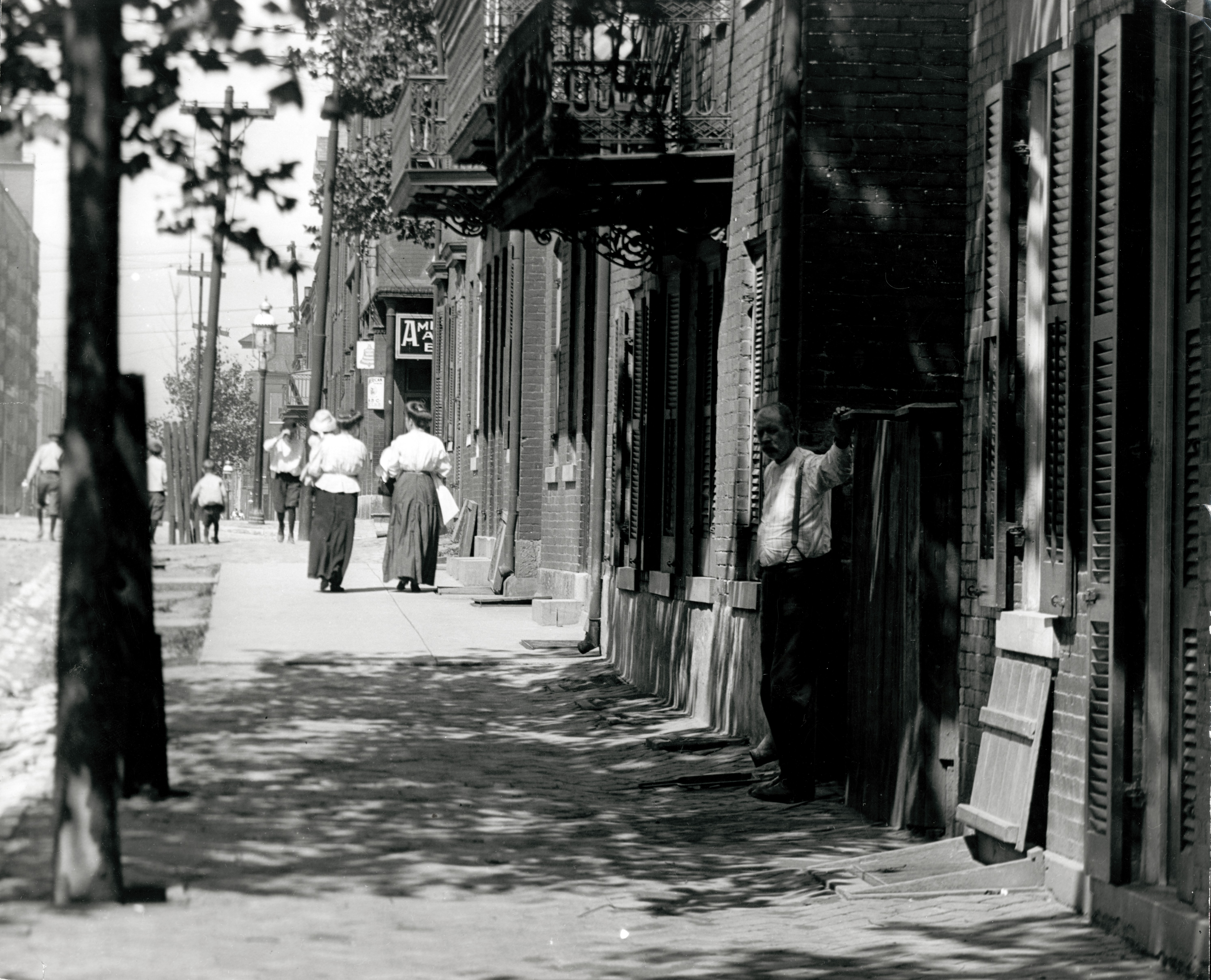
Pedestrians on South Eighth St., around 1910

== See also ==
- Anzeiger des Westens, the former large German-American daily newspaper of St. Louis, and the politically charged riot related to its readership that took place in Soulard
- Lafayette Square, St. Louis, a nearby neighborhood
- LaSalle Park, a former area of the neighborhood divided off by the construction of highways
- Missouri Rhineland, a major winemaking area in the region, both past and present
