= LaSalle Park =

Neighborhood of St. Louis in Missouri, US

Coordinates: 38.6142°N 90.2015°W

- Neighborhood of St. Louis
- French style brick houses in LaSalle Park

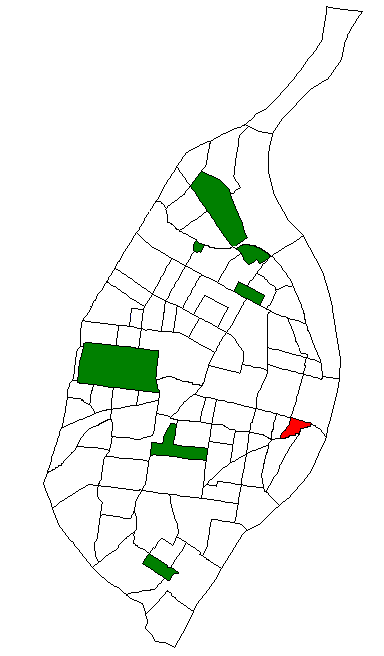
- Location (red) of LaSalle Park within St. Louis
- Country: United States
- State: Missouri
- City: St. Louis
- Ward: Ward 8

Government
  - Aldermen: Jami Cox Antwi

Area
  - Total: 0.21 sq mi (0.54 km^{2})

Population (2020)
  - Total: 1,088
  - Density: 5,200/sq mi (2,000/km^{2})
- ZIP code(s): Part of 63104
- Area code(s): 314
- Website: stlouis-mo.gov

LaSalle Park is an integral part of the three-neighborhood "Old Frenchtown" area—LaSalle Park, Lafayette Square and Soulard—bordering the southern edge of downtown St. Louis. It was formed as a "new" neighborhood, legally distinct from the larger Soulard district, through the efforts of the city of St. Louis, Missouri and Ralston Purina, (now the Nestlé Purina Petcare Company) which has its world headquarters in LaSalle Park.

LaSalle Park contains a mixture of Victorian and Federalist architecture. At least two of the homes in this French neighborhood were built at the time of the Civil War. New construction is also found in the neighborhood. The current urban renewal guidelines, approved by the City of St. Louis, require that all new construction be built in a style similar to and compatible with the existing architecture.

The LaSalle Park Neighborhood enjoys Federal Historic Status with homes that are considered to have neighborhood, city, state and nationwide architectural significance. Plans were filed by Ralston Purina Co. and Landmarks Association of St. Louis, Inc. in 1977 (revised in 1979, 1980, 1982) to establish the historic importance of the neighborhood architecturally.

== Attractions ==
Many attractions and buildings of historic importance can be found in the LaSalle Park neighborhood.

Saint John Nepomuk Church

This historic LaSalle Park church was the first Czech Catholic church in America. In 2005 it was designated a chapel, meaning it serves the Czech community for special events, but does not have a parish. Its namesake John of Nepomuk is a national saint of the Czech Republic.

St. Vincent de Paul Roman Catholic Church

The historic church building, with its Romanesque architecture, was designed by Meriwether Lewis Clark, Sr. and completed in 1843 on the southwest corner of Ninth Street and Park Avenue adjacent to Highway 55. In addition to being a vibrant congregation and frequent wedding site, Saint Vincent's now provides assistance, education and food to the homeless in downtown Saint Louis area.Official Site

Nearby attraction also include the Anheuser-Busch Brewery, which conducts free daily tours (with samples).

The Gateway Arch is in biking distance.

Scottrade Center, where the St. Louis Blues hockey club plays, and Saint Louis Union Station are also a medium walk away.

The Metrolink light-rail system has two stops (at Scottrade and at the new Busch Stadium) that are an easy walk, giving access to Forest Park, Saint Louis Zoo, Union Station, Laclede's Landing, and the airport.

Architecturally interesting homes abound in the neighborhood. Two houses built in the 1860s in the 900 block of Morrison are the first documented use of decorative steel lintels west of the Mississippi.

== Rebuilding ==
The LaSalle Park neighborhood was "cut-off" from the rest of Soulard when Interstate 55 and Interstate 44 were built through the neighborhood. The area fell into decline even while Soulard was maintained. In March 1969, 137 acres (0.55 km^{2}) were declared blighted and the Saint Louis Land Clearance for Redevelopment Authority applied for a federal planning grant to rehabilitate the neighborhood.

Federal funds were approved for redeveloping LaSalle Park in 1971. Brick sidewalks, extensive landscaping and street lamps designed to mirror those that were in the neighborhood many years prior were installed.

Property throughout the neighborhood was sold in early 1976 to both individuals and developers who were willing to restore homes and businesses or to build "in-fill" houses. These structures are so named because they are designed and built to match or resemble the surrounding architecture. Through the efforts of Ralston Purina and the City of St. Louis, an Urban Renewal Plan and Guidelines for upholding the integrity of the neighborhood's properties was established under the leadership of the LaSalle Park Redevelopment Corporation.

The neighborhood continues to operate and maintain its distinctive architectural design and character through a revision of this urban plan. In 2006, all new street lamps were installed and sidewalk repairs undertaken, to maintain the quality of life in the neighborhood.

== Demographics ==
Historical population
| Year | Pop. | ±% |
|---|---|---|
| 1990 | 2,017 | — |
| 2000 | 1,408 | −30.2% |
| 2010 | 1,299 | −7.7% |
| 2020 | 1,088 | −16.2% |

In 2020 LaSalle Park's racial makeup was 62.7% Black, 30.7% White, 0.1% Native American, 0.4% Asian, 5.4% Two or More Races, and 0.7% Some Other Race. 1.6% of the population was of Hispanic or Latino origin.

| Racial composition | 1990 | 2000 | 2010 | 2020 |
|---|---|---|---|---|
| White | 19.4% | 27.4% | 28.3% | 30.7% |
| Black or African American | 80.2% | 70.7% | 67.6% | 62.7% |
| Hispanic or Latino (of any race) | | 0.7% | 1.8% | 1.6% |
| Asian | | 0.6% | 0.7% | 0.4% |
| Two or More Races | | 1.1% | 3.1% | 5.4% |

== Sources ==
- Rodabough, John (1980). Frenchtown. Sunrise Publishing Company.
- "National Register of Historic Places - Nomination Form" (PDF). Missouri Department of Natural Resources.
- "LaSalle Park". City of St. Louis Neighborhoods.
- Bartley, Mary (1994). St. Louis Lost. Virginia Publishing. p. 79. ISBN 0-9631448-4-7.
