= Antoine Soulard =

Antoine Pierre Soulard
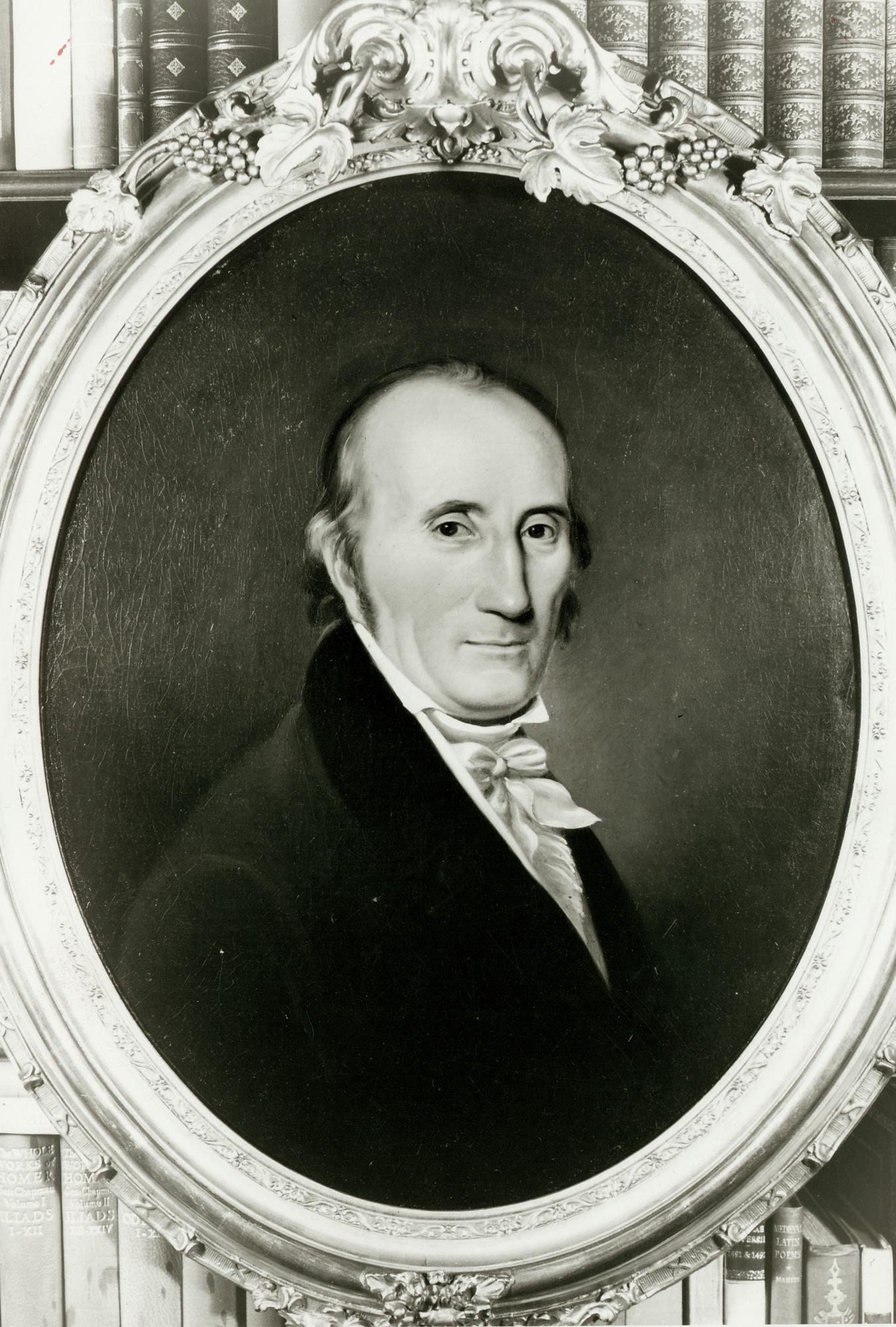
- Born: November 27, 1765; Rochefort, France
- Died: March 11, 1825 (aged 59); St. Louis, Missouri
- Occupation: surveyor
- Spouse: Marie Julia Cérre (m. 1795)

Antoine Pierre Soulard (November 27, 1765 – March 11, 1825) was an early settler and government official of St. Louis, Missouri.

== Early life ==
Born to Henri Francois Soulard and Marie Francoise (Leroux) Soulard in Rochefort, France, Soulard became a lieutenant in the French navy. His father and brother also were French naval officers. With the French Revolution, and the subsequent Reign of Terror, Soulard fled his homeland for the United States. He arrived in Marblehead, Massachusetts, in 1794. Knowing that there were many fellow Frenchmen in St. Louis, Soulard began his journey there. He traveled across Pennsylvania on horseback, then floated down the Ohio River on a keelboat, eventually arriving in Ste. Genevieve.

== Career and later life ==
Soulard arrived in Ste. Genevieve by February 1794. Rumors of an invasion of Spanish Upper Louisiana by French and American troops convinced Spanish authorities that the town needed to be fortified. Soulard was appointed to supervise the construction of a fort in Ste. Genevieve. Upon completion of the fort, Soulard then traveled to St. Louis. He introduced himself to the lieutenant-governor of Upper Louisiana, Zénon Trudeau. Soulard was appointed the first surveyor-general of Spanish Upper Louisiana on February 3, 1795, by Trudeau. He performed at least 710 surveys from 1795 to 1806. Soulard remained in this position during the tenure of the next lieutenant governor, Carlos de Hault de Lassus, eventually resigning in May 1806 after the area was turned over to the United States. Trudeau added to Soulard's responsibilities, appointing him to the position of adjutant pro tem of the lieutenant governor on October 30, 1795. Soon after this new appointment, Soulard married Marie Julia Cérre, the daughter of a wealthy merchant and fur-trader, Jean-Gabriel Cerré.

Soulard and his wife remained in St. Louis for the rest of their lives. They had several children, including James Gaston, Henry Gustave, Eliza, and Benjamin Antoine. Soulard died in St. Louis on March 10, 1825, and was interred in Calvary Cemetery. The Soulard neighborhood and Soulard Farmers Market in St. Louis are named for the Soulard family.
