= Marie Julia Cérre Soulard =

American landowner (1775–1845)

Julia Soulard
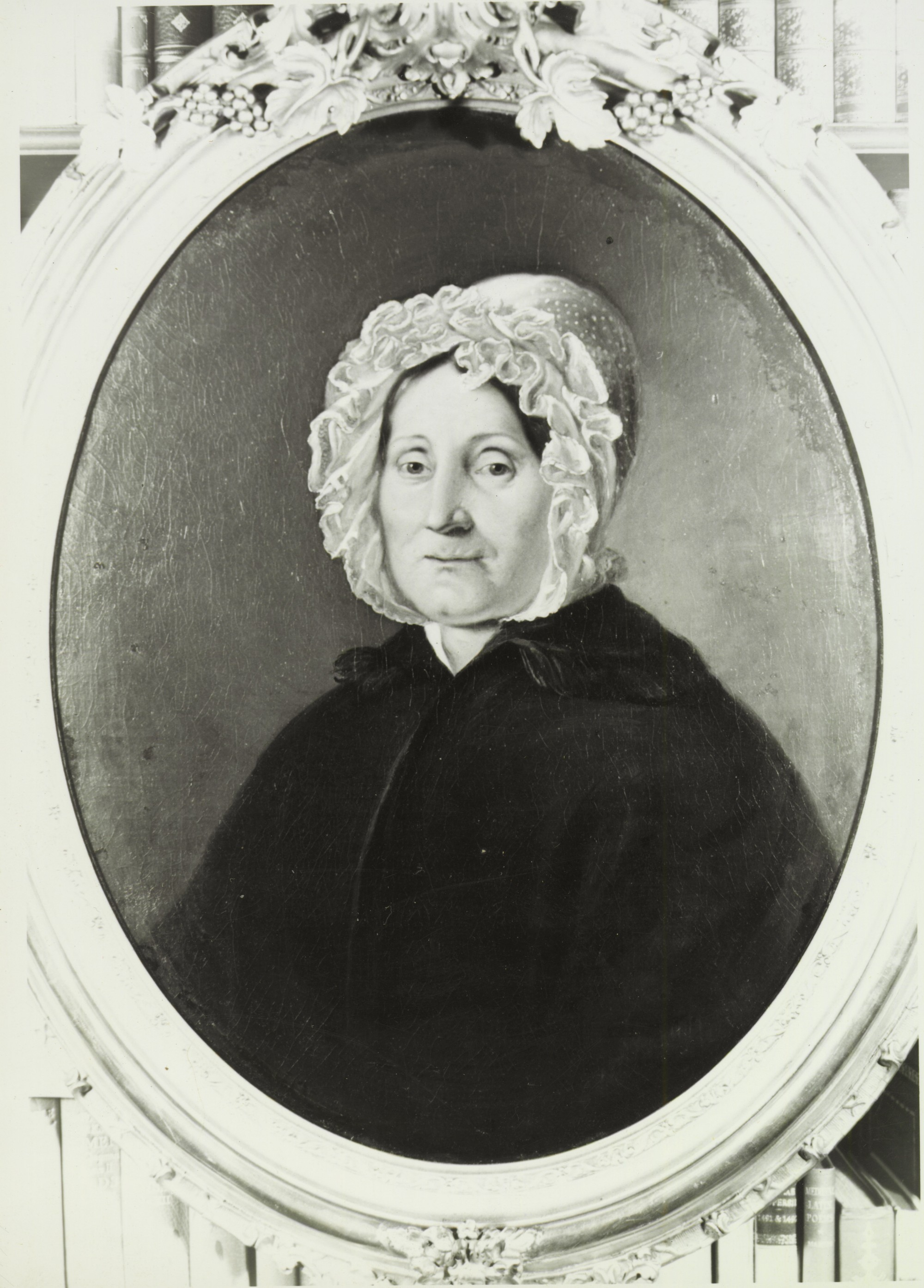
- Born: Marie Julia Cerré; 1775; Illinois Country
- Died: 1845 (aged 69–70); St. Louis, Missouri, United States
- Occupation: Landowner
- Spouse: Antoine Soulard

Marie "Julia" Soulard, née Cerré (1775–1845) was an American landowner. Soulard donated the land that hosts Soulard Farmers Market to the city of St. Louis, Missouri.

Marie Julia Cerré was likely born at Kaskaskia in the Illinois Country, where her father, Montreal-born Jean-Gabriel Cerré, was a successful merchant. Her mother was Catherine Cerré, née Giard. Julia Cerré Soulard had an older sister, Marie Thérèse, who married Auguste Chouteau, the founder of St. Louis.

Her father moved to St. Louis in 1779 or 1780, some fifteen years after St. Louis was founded and some time after he had taken possession of a significant amount of property in the region. In 1795, Julia Cerré married Antoine Pierre Soulard (1766–1825). Antoine Soulard, a refugee of the French Revolution, was working as the Surveyor-General of Upper Louisiana when St. Louis was in Spanish territory. Her father gifted them 63 acres or 76 arpents of land when they married. Antoine Soulard developed an orchard on the property. She and Antoine Soulard had four children: James Gaston, Elizabeth, Henry "Gustave", and Benjamin.

After the Louisiana Purchase, the validity of Soulard's ownership of the land was called into question. Antoine Soulard filed suit but died intestate; his heirs, including Julia Soulard, spent over a decade fighting for ownership. The case went to the Supreme Court of Missouri and later the Supreme Court of the United States. The claimants lost in Soulard and others vs. United States in 1830. However, the Soulards were awarded 124 acres in 1836.

Julia Soulard lived on the land until 1836, when part of it was annexed to the city of St. Louis; this was known as "Soulard's first addition." A second addition was annexed in 1842, with Soulard transferring some land to the city under her condition that it be used as a public market. Soulard worked with Bishop Joseph Rosati to build a church, Holy Trinity, on two lots she donated. Holy Trinity did not materialize due to low funds; later Vincentian Fathers took over the property and built St. Vincent de Paul Catholic Church on the site, 1427 S. Ninth Street.

Soulard and her family members were interred in Calvary Cemetery in St. Louis. The neighborhood Soulard, Julia's Cafe at Soulard Farmers Market, Soulard Street, Cerre Street, and Julia Street are named for Soulard and her family.

== See also ==
- Soulard Farmers Market
- Soulard, St. Louis
