= Soulard Farmers Market =

Market in St. Louis, Missouri

Coordinates: 38.6107°N 90.2011°W

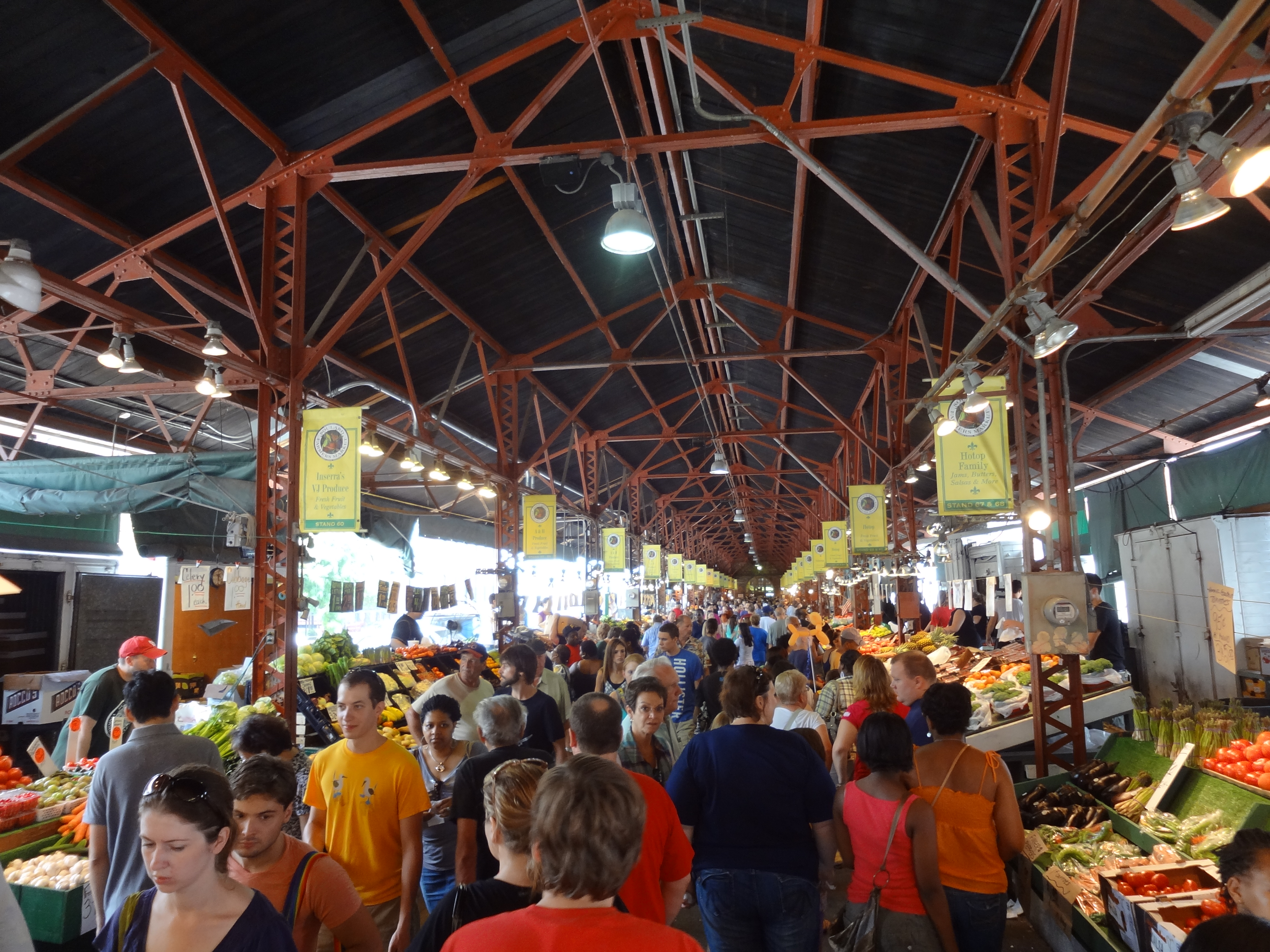
Soulard Farmers Market on a Saturday morning, August 2011

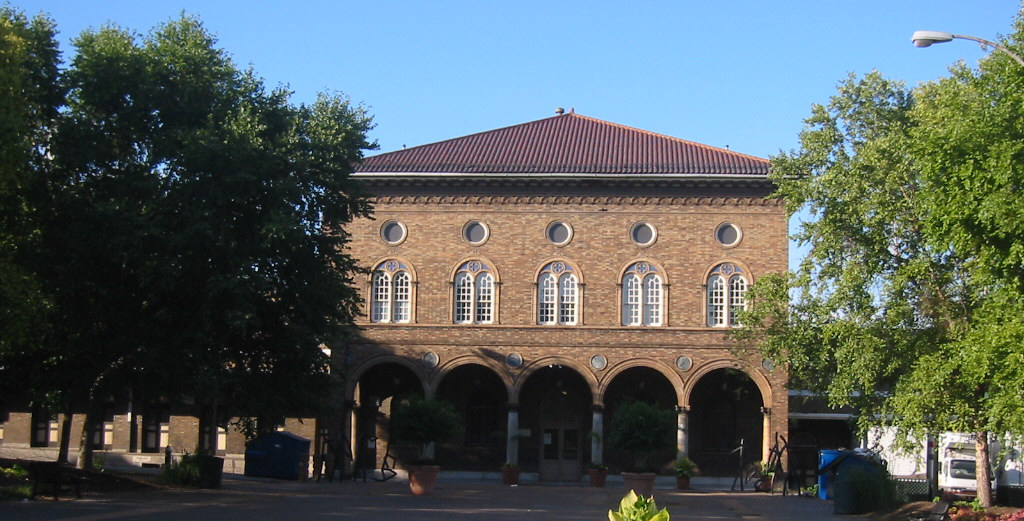
Grand Hall at Soulard Farmers Market, July 2007

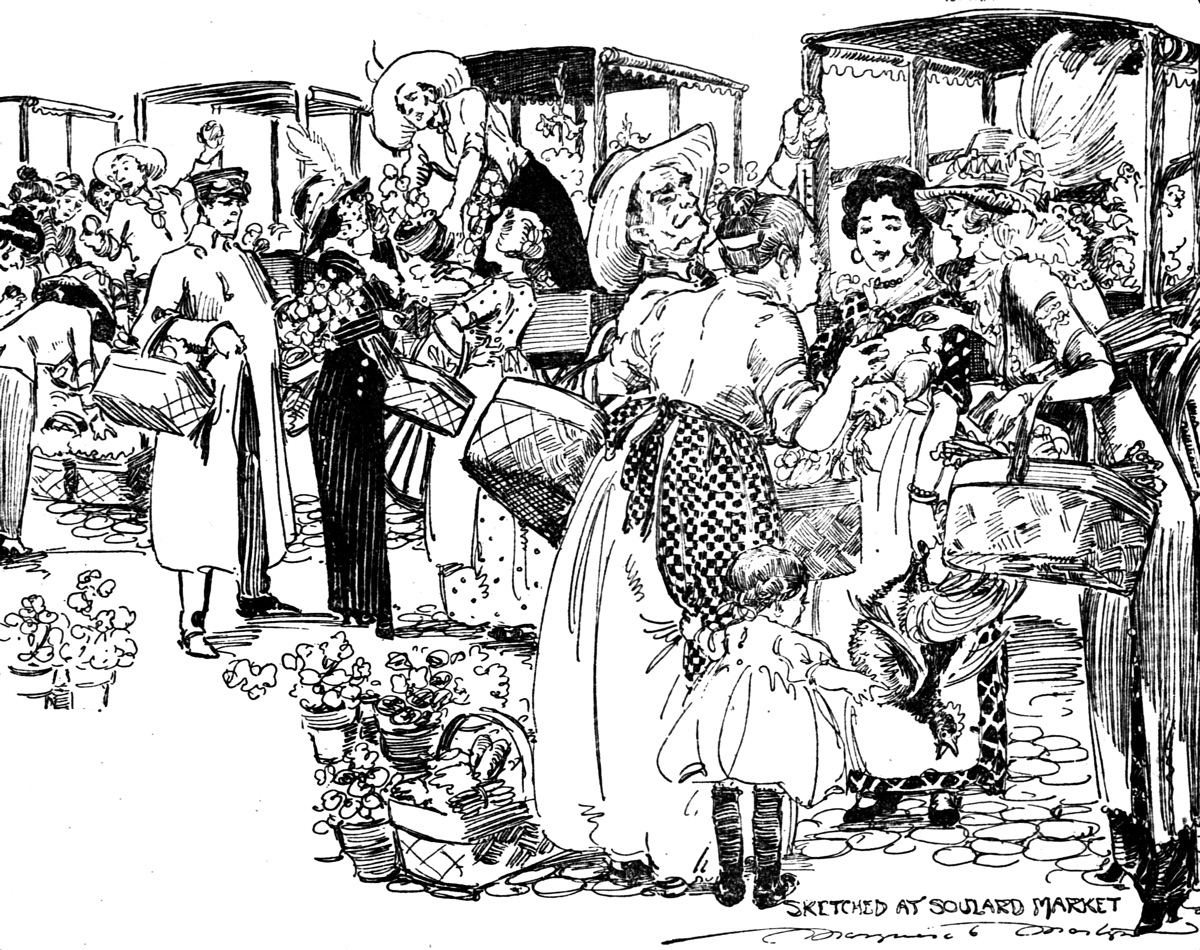
Drawing of Soulard Market by Marguerite Martyn, 1912

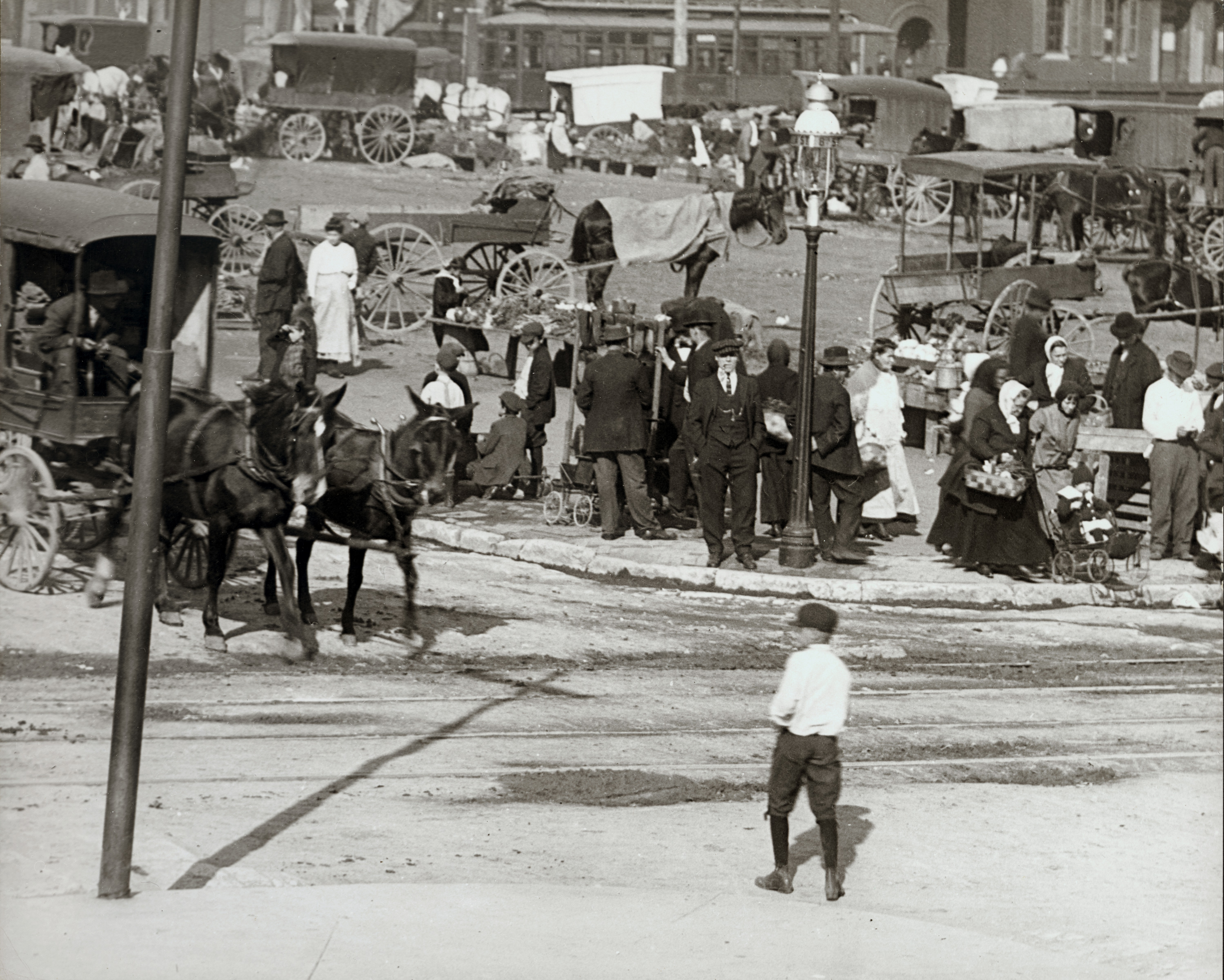
Soulard Market with crowds of people and horse-drawn carriages, 1910

Soulard Farmers Market is the oldest operating public market in St. Louis, Missouri in the Soulard neighborhood, and the only one operated by the city. It has a reputation of being the oldest public market in the United States west of the Mississippi River.

== History ==
=== Beginnings ===
In 1779, the market began at a flat meadow where farmers came to sell their goods. It was the third public marketplace in St. Louis. Antoine Soulard, who was born in 1766 in Rochefort, France, was an aristocrat and former French military officer who escaped France to avoid the consequences of the French Revolution. In 1795, he married Julia Cerré, whose father, Gabriel Cerré, received a grant from Spain for the land where the market was located in 1782. Gabriel Cerré gave his son-in-law, Soulard, a 122-acre plot of land that included the market area.

In 1803, however, the Louisiana Purchase caused a legal battle over ownership of the land, until in 1836, when after Soulard’s death in 1825, his widow, Julia Cerré Soulard, acquired the deed to the land. In 1835, her land was subdivided and incorporated in the city limits of St. Louis. By 1841–42, Julia Soulard had donated to the City of St. Louis two city blocks to be the farmers market which was then known as Soulard Market with the condition that it would remain a public marketplace. In 1845, Julia Soulard died, and in 1854, the city owned the property of the market.

=== Structures ===
Prior to any buildings, local farmers set up in a ring with horses and wagons, from which they would sell their goods. Some farmers would set up as early as 3 a.m., customers would arrive around 6 a.m., and by 10 a.m. the market would be full of people. In the late 1830s–1840s, a main market building was built and other various buildings were erected as well. During the Civil War, it served as a Union Army encampment.

These structures were severely damaged by the 1896 St. Louis–East St. Louis tornado. The roof of the market was blown off and a large part of the building was flattened. Nine people were found dead in the rubble.

=== New building ===
In 1929, a Renaissance-style building replaced the original, and was modeled after the Foundling Hospital designed by Filippo Brunelleschi in 1419 in Florence, Italy. This Grand Hall is shaped like the letter ‘H’, having four wings. This building, the design of Albert Osberg, contains Grand Hall shops on the first floor and gymnasium/theater on the second floor. The four wings consist of vendor stalls.

The symmetrical building is five bays wide; its first story has a central, arched entry flanked by multi-light windows under a colonnade. The second story also has multi-light windows, grouped in pairs. Above are porthole windows, topped by a Romanesque corbel table under a pyramidal tile roof. Four open-air wings supported by metal posts extend from the main building.

== Present day ==
The market is open from Wednesday through Saturday all year, and Saturdays are the busiest days. Soulard Market has more than 140 vendors. The Grand Hall shops contain permanent stores that include bakeries, butcher shops, florists, and a spice shop, among others. The vendors sell a variety of goods, such as fresh produce, fish, cheese, soap, and handicrafts. Oftentimes, the vendors have stall leases passed down through multiple generations. Parking (free and metered), a playground, a park, and a plaza are in close proximity. On Saturday mornings, a local chef creates a dish with items from the local produce. Many vendors are only present on Saturdays.

Several studies were conducted at Soulard Farmers Market, where both wholesale and retail sales occurred. It was noted that as in other "farmers" markets, most vendors were not farmers, but rather merchants who purchased wholesale produce. They usually procure their fruits and vegetables from Produce Row, which is a wholesale market in the city.

== See also ==
- Soulard, St. Louis
