= Jean-Pierre Chouteau =

American merchant (1758–1849)

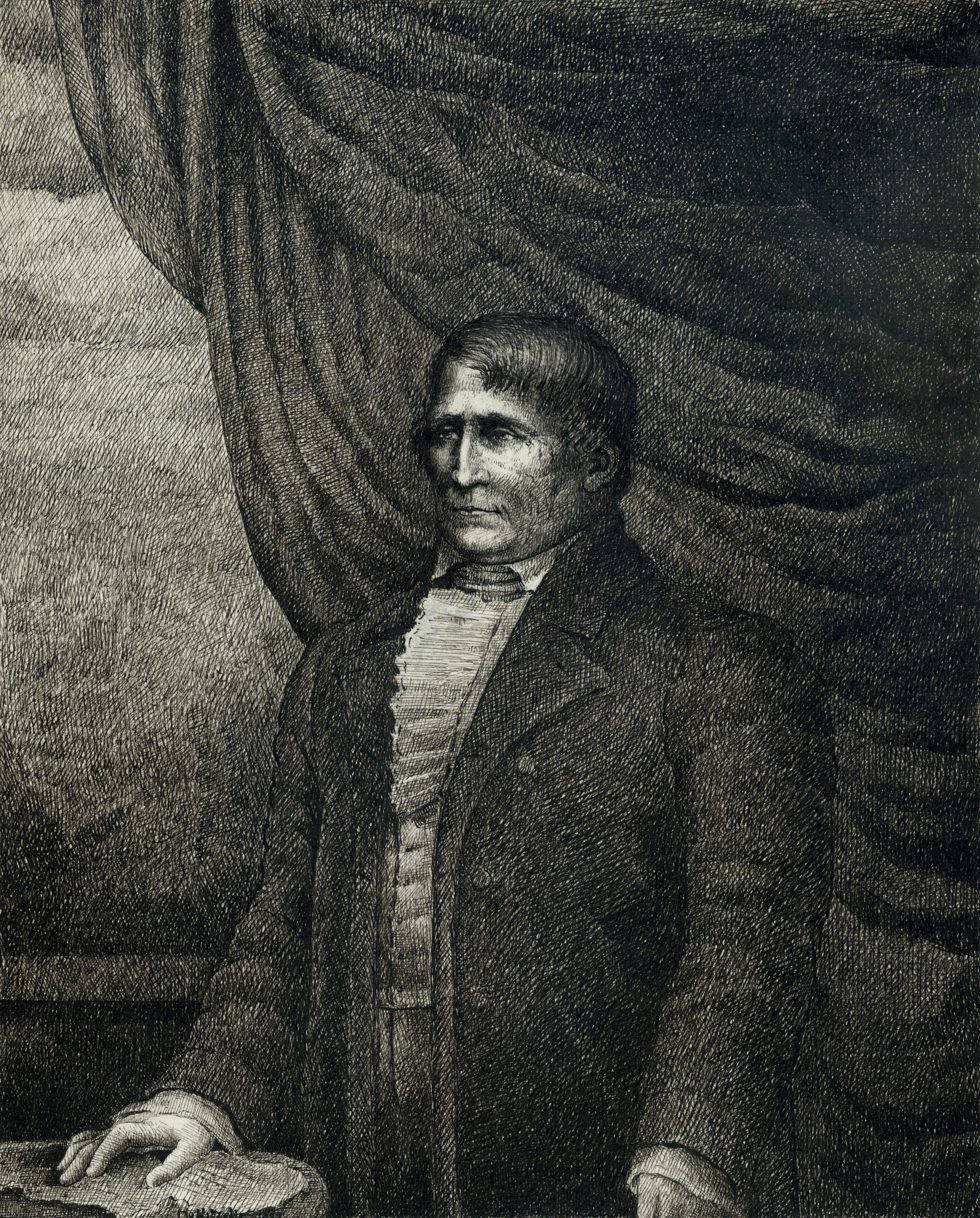
- Born: 10 October 1758; New Orleans, Louisiana (New France)
- Died: 10 July 1849 (aged 90); St. Louis County, Missouri, USA
- Parents: Pierre Laclède (father); Marie-Thérèse Bourgeois Chouteau (mother)

Jean-Pierre Chouteau (French pronunciation: [ʒɑ̃ pjɛʁ ʃuto]; 10 October 1758 – 10 July 1849) was a French Creole fur trader, merchant, politician, and slaveholder. An early settler of St. Louis from New Orleans, he became one of its most prominent citizens. He and his family were prominent in establishing the fur trade in the city, which became the early source of its wealth.

In 1975, he was inducted into the Hall of Great Westerners of the National Cowboy & Western Heritage Museum in Oklahoma City, Oklahoma.

== Early life ==
Jean Pierre Chouteau, known as Pierre, was the son of Marie-Therese Bourgeois Chouteau and Pierre de Laclède de Liguest, the latter originally of Bedous in far southwestern France. Pierre was born in New Orleans, when it was still under the authority of New France. He had three younger sisters.

== Marriage and family ==
Jean-Pierre Chouteau married Pélagie Kiercereau on 26 July 1783 in St. Louis, where he had settled with his parents. Together they had four children:

- Auguste P. Chouteau (1786–1838), a graduate of West Point who worked as a fur trader
- Pierre Chouteau, Jr. (1789–1865), founder of fur trading posts on Upper Missouri River, including Fort Pierre, South Dakota, and posts in Chouteau County, Montana
- Pélagie Chouteau (1790–after 1824), wife of Bartholomew Berthold, an Italian-born fur trader who was affiliated with the Chouteaus; Fort Berthold was named for him
- Paul Liguest Chouteau (1792–1851), married Constance Chauvet-Dubreuil in St. Louis.

Shortly after Pélagie's death, the widower Chouteau married Brigitte Saucier on 17 February 1794, in St. Louis. They had five children, one of whom died in infancy.

- François G. Chouteau (1797–1838), first official European settler and founder of Kansas City, Missouri
- Cyprien Chouteau (1802–1879), employee of the Chouteau-Sarpy Fur Company based in Kansas City
- Pharamond Chouteau (1806–1831), died at age 24
- Frederick Chouteau (1809–1891), fur trader and broker in Westport, Missouri; married four times

== Chouteau-Osage fur trade ==
Jean-Pierre and his half-brother Auguste Chouteau, known as the "river barons," adjusted to the many political changes which came about as the town changed from Spanish rule to becoming part of the United States after the latter's Louisiana Purchase in 1803. They continued to create political alliances with numerous parties. For a long time, they held monopoly rights on the lucrative fur trade with the Osage, and they expanded their St. Louis businesses to many parts of the emerging economy.

As soon as the early 1760s, the Chouteau family started fur trades with the Osage Indians. Jean-Pierre Chouteau spent considerable time among the Osage, where he learned their language, culture and customs. In 1796, he established a trading post in the western part of their territory, at the junction of the Neosho River and Saline Creek, which became the first permanent European (white) settlement at present-day Salina, Oklahoma. In the very early 1800s, the Chouteau-Osage alliance contributed to 50% of Indian goods traded in Saint Louis.

On March 19, 1799, Chouteau acquired 30,000 arpents of territory now known as Chouteau Springs, Missouri from the Osage.

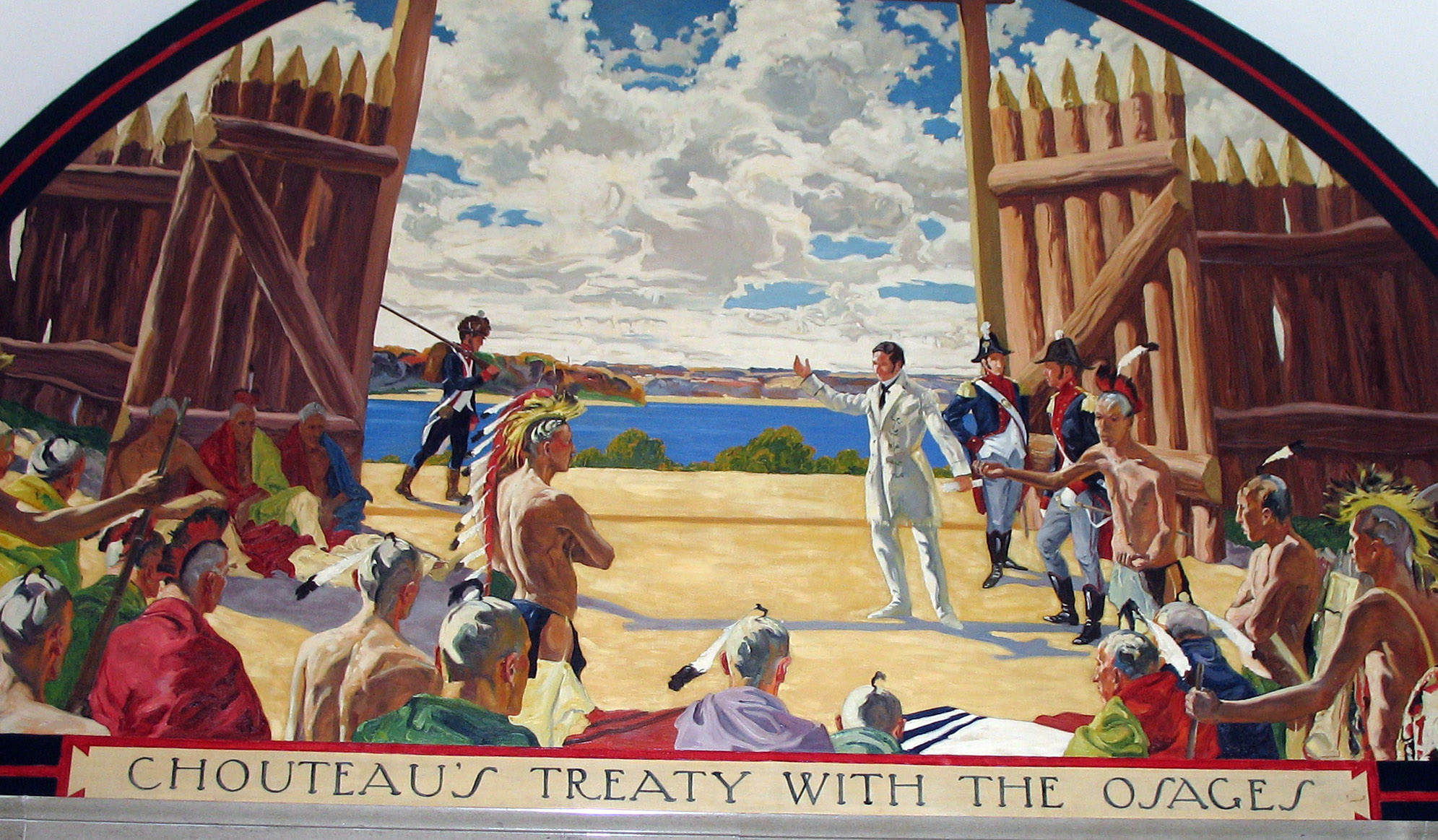
Chouteau's Treaty with the Osages, painted 1924 by Walter Ufer, at the Missouri State Capitol.

On July 14, 1804, President Thomas Jefferson named Chouteau the US Agent for Indian affairs west of the Mississippi River. This was a major step for Chouteau to gain access to officials of the new American federal government, but he also delivered on his responsibilities. After being appointed a United States agent of Indian Affairs, Chouteau founded the Missouri Fur Company in St. Louis in 1804, together with Manuel Lisa, a Spanish trader from New Orleans. He devoted much of his energies to his company's fur trading activities with other family members, becoming one of the wealthiest residents of St. Louis. He became very wealthy and influential in St. Louis, and managed to retain considerable political power after the United States' Louisiana Purchase.

As negotiator of the Treaty of Fort Clark, also known as the Osage Treaty of 1808, Chouteau convinced the Osage to sell large portions of their land in present-day Missouri and Arkansas to European-American settlers for Federal annuities.

In addition, the Chouteau brothers kept up connections with Spanish authorities, further west. The Spanish gave Pierre Chouteau an exclusive license, in 1817, to trade with the Osage, in their region, west of US holdings. His fur trading business thrived, making him one of the wealthiest men in St. Louis.

Chouteau was elected to the St. Louis Board of Trustees and became its first chairman. As a measure of his influence, he was elected to serve on half of the twelve boards chosen between 1810 and 1822. He also was appointed as justice of the peace.

== Slave freedom suits ==
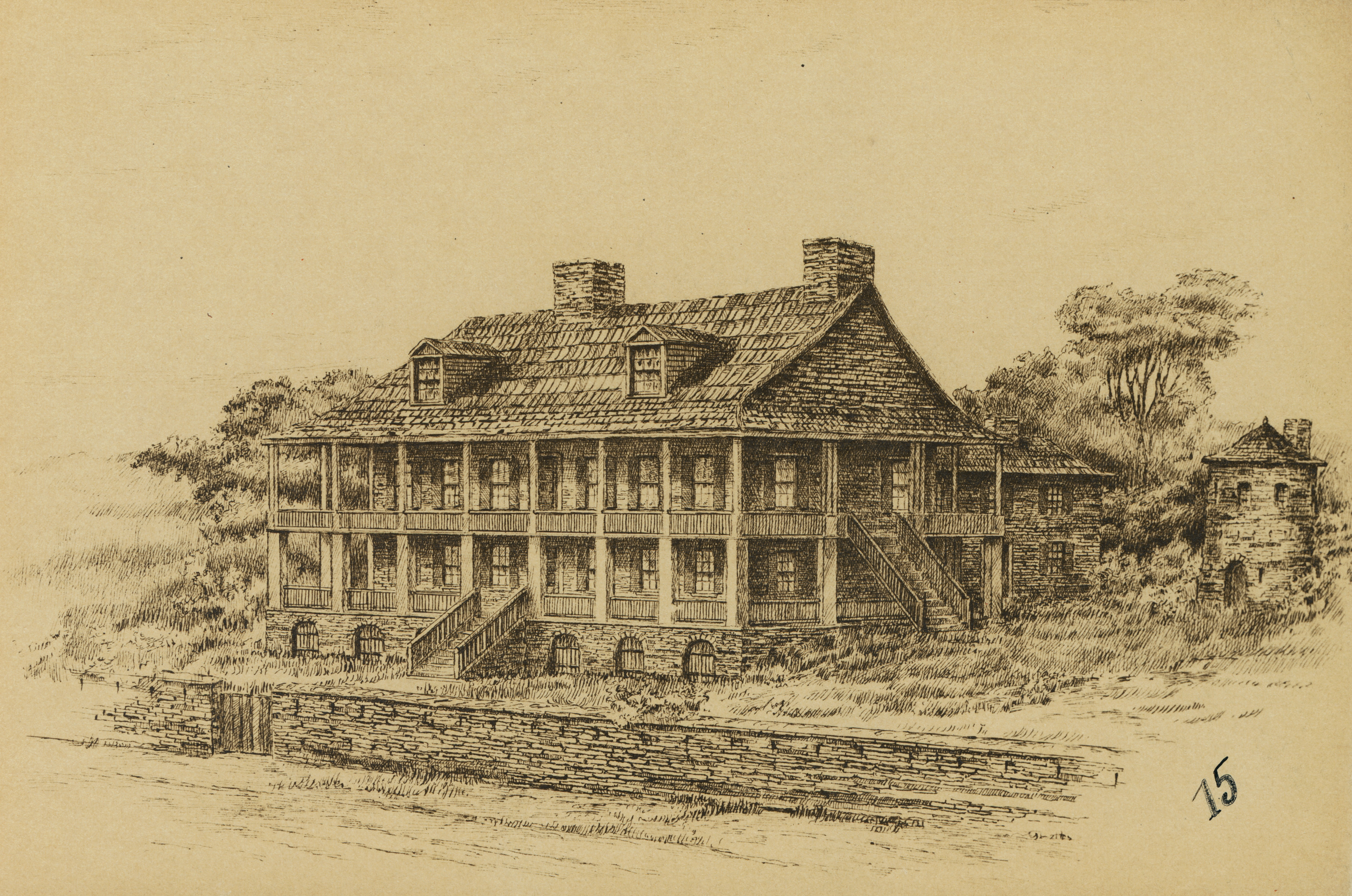
Jean Pierre Chouteau Sr. Residence. Southwest corner of Main and Washington streets. Built 1785 by Clamorgan.

St. Louis was the site of hundreds of "freedom suits" filed by slaves seeking freedom on varying grounds of "wrongful enslavement". In 1826 Pierre Chouteau was sued by his slave Marguerite, who in 1805 had earlier filed the first freedom suit in St. Louis against a former master. She was of African and Natchez descent, the latter through her late mother Marie-Jean Scypion and Natchez grandmother. The Spanish officials had outlawed Indian slavery in 1769, after it took over former French territory, but it had been common before that in territorial Missouri under French rule.

Scypion's children asserted that as their maternal grandmother was Natchez Indian, their mother should have been freed in 1769, and they should have been considered free at birth, by the principle of partus. Since the colonial period, the social status of children was determined by that of the mother. Thus a child of a slave was born into slavery, regardless of paternal ancestry. Although the Scypion daughters and their descendants won, the decision was reversed by a higher court. For 30 years, Scypion's descendants did not give up their dream of freedom.

At the end of 1824, the Missouri General Assembly passed a law providing a process for enslaved persons to sue for freedom and have some protections in the process. In 1825 Marguerite renewed her case against Pierre Chouteau, Sr., who was by then her master, in the St. Louis Circuit Court, as did her sisters against their masters. The cases were rolled into one under Marguerite's name. Although the judgment and appeal to the Missouri Supreme Court went against the Scypion descendants, the case was reviewed in 1834 and a new trial was ordered. The slaves' counsel asked for a change of venue because of the Chouteau family's prominence in St. Louis, which the court granted. The venue was changed first to St. Charles County and then to Jefferson County before the case came to trial on November 8, 1836. The jury decided unanimously in favor of Marguerite and the other Scypion descendants, a decision that withstood appeals up to the US Supreme Court in 1838. This case was considered to officially end Indian slavery in Missouri.

The head of a large and influential family, Jean-Pierre Chouteau died in St. Louis at 90 years of age.
