= Marie-Thérèse Bourgeois Chouteau =

American matriarch (1733–1814)

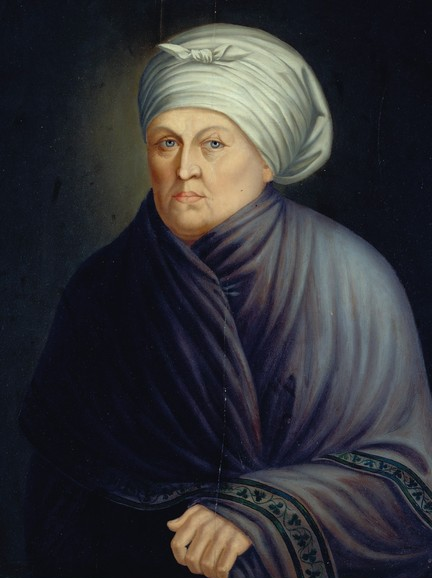
Oil on board portrait of Madame Marie Therese Bourgeois Chouteau

Marie-Thérèse Bourgeois Chouteau (January 14, 1733 – August 14, 1814) was the matriarch of the Chouteau fur trading family, which founded communities throughout the Midwest. She is considered the "Mother" of St. Louis, and was influential in its founding and development. She helped lead it to becoming an important American town and the Gateway to the West.

== Early life ==
Born in New Orleans on January 13, 1733, she had a French father (Nicolas Bourgeois) and Spanish mother (Marie Joseph Tarare). Shortly after she turned six years old, her father died, leaving her mother, her two siblings, and her. The following year, Marie-Therèse's mother remarried, to Nicholas Pierre Carco. Marie-Thérèse lived with her mother and stepfather until she married. They were unable to provide her with a dowry. It is thought that she returned to their household when her marriage fell apart four years later.

At the age of 15, on September 20, 1748, Marie-Therèse married René Auguste Chouteau, Sr., an older tavern keeper and baker. Her family had arranged it, and believed it would be good, given their daughter's limited prospects. According to commonly accepted histories, René deserted her after she gave birth to René Auguste Chouteau, Jr., in 1749. Her husband returned to France. Neither the Catholic Church nor the state allowed divorce. Afterward, Marie-Therèse Chouteau referred to herself as a widow, as it gave her more legal and social rights. As a widow, she could own property and have custody over her children.

== Relationship with Laclède ==
Chouteau began a relationship with fur trader Pierre Laclède around 1755. With him, she had four children: Jean Pierre in 1758, Marie Pelagie (1760), Marie Louise (1762), and Victoire Chouteau (1764). They were baptized in the cathedral in New Orleans, with Rene Chouteau recorded as the father for each child.

A French merchant and official in New Orleans sponsored an expedition north on the Mississippi River to seek additional places for a trading post. He hired Laclède (who also took Auguste Chouteau, Junior, his stepson and Marie-Therese's legal son with Rene) to find a good site for another settlement. Laclede and Chouteau are largely credited with founding a post in 1764. It was called St. Louis in honor of France's patron saint.

That year Marie-Therese traveled with her other four children to the new, developing colony. At first, she lived with most other settlers at the trading post. Laclède is said to have built her a stone house in 1767. During this time, she kept owned and marketed cattle, kept bees, and conducted business.

A few years later, the elder René Chouteau returned to New Orleans and demanded that authorities make her join him. In 1774 Louisiana Governor Luis de Unzaga ordered her to return. She delayed and the order was generally ignored by officials. The elder Chouteau died in New Orleans in 1776. Though now the legal widow could have married Laclède, she refrained from doing so. By this time, Laclède had fallen into a lot of debt. She did not want to be legally responsible for paying off his creditors, and he died in 1778.

== Legacy and success in St. Louis ==
Laclède died in 1778. Marie-Therèse continued to live in the stone house Laclède had built for her. She continued to be an influential figure in the St. Louis colony.

In addition, she helped her sons with controlling the fur trade; these sons later became leaders in St. Louis government and business for the years to follow. Her daughters as well were successful in their own rights. Given her large fortune made from her businesses, Chouteau helped them marry well by giving them large dowries. Also suitors wanted to be affiliated with the influential Chouteau family.

Madame Chouteau died on August 14, 1814. She was buried on the grounds of the Basilica of St. Louis, King of France. (This is now within the grounds of the Gateway Arch National Park). During the cholera epidemic of 1849, bodies were dug up from this area to reinter them at Calvary and Bellefontaine cemeteries. Chouteau's remains were not found or reinterred.

== Challenges to the legend ==
Contemporary 21st-century histories of St. Louis attribute a founding role in the city to Auguste Chouteau, including The First Chouteaus: RIVER BARONS OF EARLY ST. LOUIS (2000) by William E Foley and C David Rice ISBN 0-252-06897-1 and Before Lewis and Clark: The Story of the Chouteaus, the French Dynasty That Ruled America's Frontier (2004) by Shirley Christian ISBN 0-374-52958-2.

Challenges have been made to elements of the matriarch's history, including by some descendants. Part of the challenges seemed to be efforts to show that Marie-Therese Chouteau did not have a relationship outside of marriage. Other challenges arose from conflicting documentation in formal records.

Laclède and Marie Therese were said to have had a common law marriage. Laclède was thought to have assigned part of his property to her and their children to protect them financially. This was to enable her to maintain the appearance that she was in a proper civil law relationship with the elder Rene Chouteau.

Records at the St. Louis Cathedral (New Orleans) indicate that all the Chouteau children were baptized there, with Rene Chouteau recorded as the father, even after he was documented elsewhere as having returned to France. According to a 1934 article, records in the colony did not affirm that Laclède left an inheritance to the Chouteaus. But the elder Rene Chouteau did leave an estate to his widow and children with his surname.

Nicolas de Finiels, a French officer serving the Spaniards, notes no founding role for Auguste Chouteau in his 1790s account of the settlement. (His account was not published in English until decades later.) He noted that there was already a hamlet at the site of St. Louis before the official founding of the city.

The first St. Louis city directory was published in 1820. Its historical introduction made no mention of Auguste Chouteau's having had a role in founding the settlement. By this time Anglo Americans had taken over dominance of the city. In 1847, when the city had its first celebration of its past, Chouteau's name was not mentioned at all.

The earliest St. Louis historian, Wilson Primm, dismissed the story of Auguste Chouteau. According to him, Auguste Chouteau's role in the founding is based only on his testimony in an 1820s land dispute, and on an unsigned manuscript "Journal" attributed to him in 1857, when his surviving son, Gabriel Chouteau, announced finding it.
