= Pierre Laclède =

French-American city founder (1729–1778)

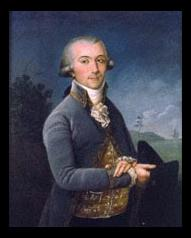
- Born: 22 November 1729; Bedous, Béarn, France
- Died: 20 June 1778 (aged 48); Near the mouth of the Arkansas River
- Occupation: Fur trader
- Known for: Founding St. Louis

Signature
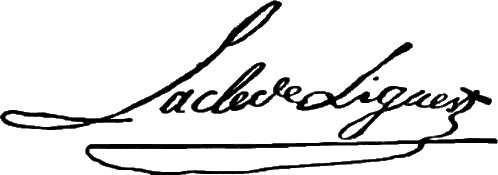

Pierre Laclède Liguest or Pierre Laclède (22 November 1729 – 20 June 1778) was a French fur trader who, with his young assistant and stepson Auguste Chouteau, founded St. Louis in 1764, in what was then Spanish Upper Louisiana, in present-day Missouri.

== Early life ==
Laclède was born on 22 November 1729 in Bedous, Béarn, France. He was one of the younger sons in his family, with parents being office-holders, authors, and scholars of some prominence. His father, and later inherited by his brother, held the position of avocat au parlement de Navarre, a traditional region including Béarn, located in Pau. His uncle, likewise, was a man of letters, writing a history of Portugal. Overall, Laclède is said to be a reflection of desire for knowledge that filled his whole family.

In 1755, Laclède migrated to New Orleans at the age of 26. It was part of the French colony known as La Louisiane. The cause of his trip is argued about; some historians believe he was traveling for pleasure. Others say that he was looking to make his fortune in the new lands, as done by many other younger sons. Laclède was said to have given up positions in the church or army in order to explore the new world. Over the next few years after his arrival in New Orleans, he became a highly successful fur trader. Unlike some contemporaries, he embraced the change from his family's traditions. Historians have commented on his energy, knowledge, and good judgement, which suggest past business experience, and a greater understanding for his success as a merchant.

During this time, Laclède began to form relationships with the officials and Native Americans in the region around New Orleans. It was through many of these conversations that Laclède learned of the opportunities that awaited further north, which inspired his exploration of the Mississippi at its confluence with the Missouri and Illinois rivers.

== Personal life ==
When first arriving in New Orleans, Laclède is described as handsome. He was said to be olive-skinned with dark eyes, tall and slender. He moved like a fencer with extreme grace and ease and retained an air of command at all time. He was said to have won a swordsmanship duel in France before departure but the prize is unknown.

In New Orleans, Laclède met and fell in love with Madame Marie-Therese Bourgeois Chouteau. It is documented that they had a liaison for many years following, four children together: Jean Pierre (1758), Marie Pélagie (1760), Marie Louise (1762), and Victoire (1764) Chouteau. Madame Chouteau at the time was married to René Auguste Chouteau. Ten years her senior, Rene had owned an inn and tavern at the time of their marriage. Her mother and stepfather arranged the marriage and considered it good, as they could not give the 15-year-old girl a dowry. But Rene was reportedly an abusive husband. In addition, not long after the birth of their first son, Rene Auguste Chouteau, Jr., called Auguste, her husband left her and their son in New Orleans and returned to France without them.

As divorce was not allowed during that time by the Catholic Church or the state, Madame Chouteau was legally married to Rene during most of her relationship with Laclède. They were subject to gossip and the risk of Rene's returning and claiming rights with her.

Soon after founding the post of St. Louis in 1764, Laclède wrote to Madame Chouteau, telling her to come to the colony. Later that year, after she gave birth to her fifth child and Laclède's fourth, she traveled upriver with all their children. Laclède was said to have built a house for them and bequeathed it to them in his will. Madame Chouteau was well loved in the colony; she was kind but sensible, understanding but stubborn. Within a few years, people started referring to her as the "Queen" of St. Louis.

A few years after arriving to St. Louis, René, Madame Chouteau's husband, returned to New Orleans, and required that his wife return to him. By law, he was allowed to do this. Various governmental officials tried to slow down the process of Madame Chouteau returning to her husband, sending letters that ended requiring more letters. Before further action, René Chouteau died in a drunken stupor one night, thus ending his threat.

== Founding of St. Louis ==
Laclède was sponsored by the New Orleans merchant Gilbert Antoine de Saint-Maxent in 1763 to construct a trading post near the confluence of the Mississippi and Missouri rivers. Maxent was offered monopolies by D'Abbadie, which were passed on to Laclède as a six-year trading monopoly with the area's Native Americans.

Given the length and the impending winter, Laclède began prepping for the journey immediately. In August, he embarked with a small crew, which included his common law wife's son, René-Auguste Chouteau, Jr. Though few outposts or trading posts were already set-up, many Europeans had made the journey up the Mississippi River, making the trip more monotonous than exciting. They arrived at the confluence in December. The confluence area was too marshy to build a town, so they selected a site 18 miles (29 km) downriver. Legend has it that St. Louis was founded on Saint Valentine's Day of 1764. In the 1770 census of Spanish Illinois, Laclede is listed as the owner of seven enslaved Native Americans.

The St. Louis downtown riverfront area is named Laclede's Landing in his honor. He is also the namesake of Laclede County, Missouri, Laclede, Missouri, the Laclede Gas Company, the Pierre Laclede Honors College at the University of Missouri–St. Louis, Pierre Laclede Elementary School in St. Louis and the Pierre Laclede office tower in Clayton, Missouri. Laclede is also recognized with a star on the St. Louis Walk of Fame.

== See also ==
- Laclede's Landing, St. Louis
- LaClede Town
