= Auguste Chouteau =

American settler, fur trader, and politician

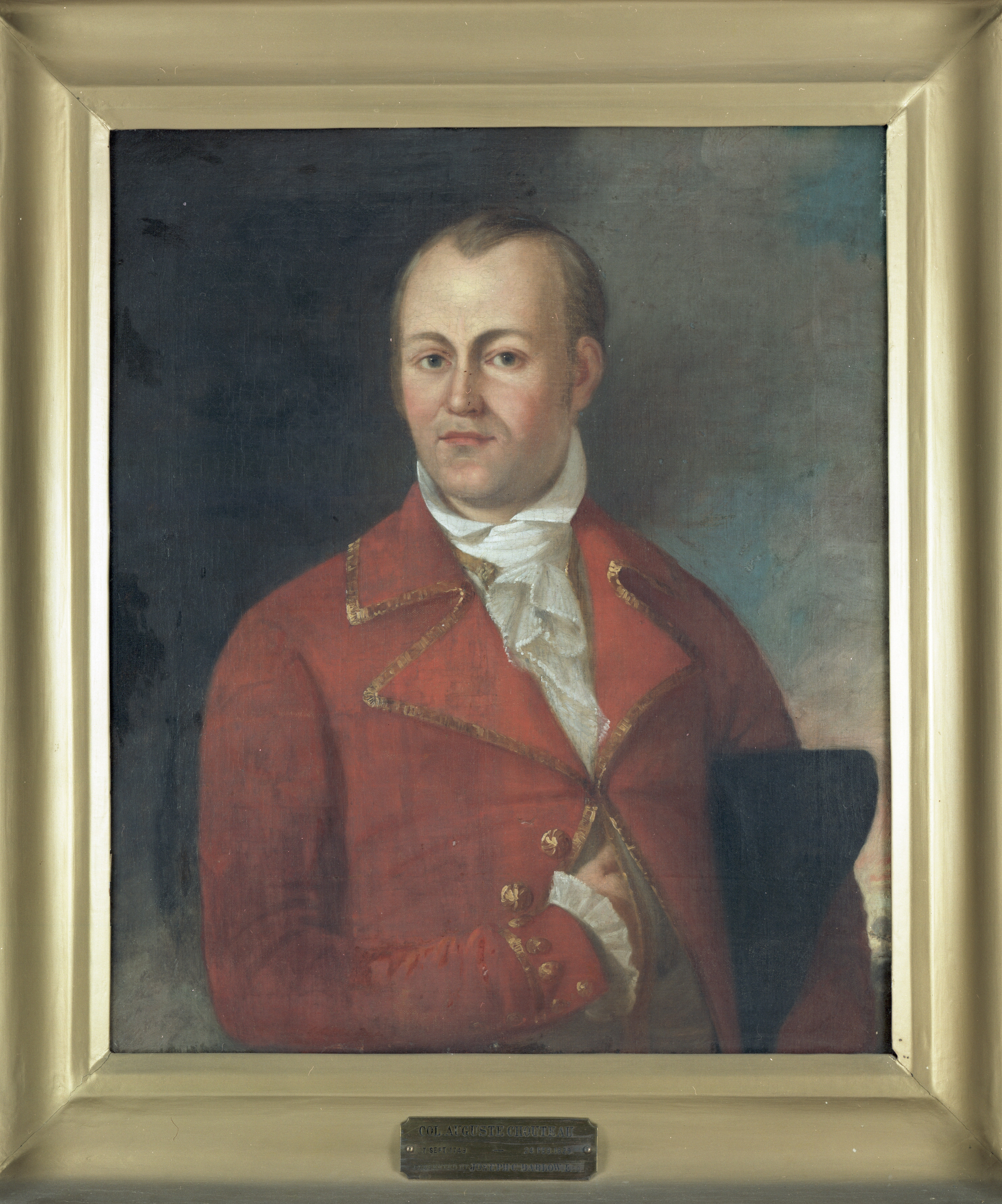
- Born: September 7, 1749; New Orleans, Louisiana (New France)
- Died: February 24, 1829 (aged 79); St. Louis, Missouri, United States
- Burial place: Calvary Cemetery

Signature
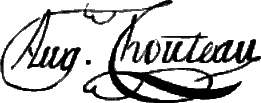

René-Auguste Chouteau Jr. (French pronunciation: [ʁəne oɡyst ʃuto]; September 7, 1749, or September 26, 1750 – February 24, 1829), also known as Auguste Chouteau, was one of the founders of St. Louis, Missouri, a successful fur trader and a politician. He and his partner had a monopoly for many years of fur trade with the large Osage tribe on the Missouri River. He had numerous business interests in St. Louis and was well-connected with the various rulers: French, Spanish, and American.

== Early life and education ==
On September 20, 1748, Marie-Thérèse Bourgeois married René Auguste Chouteau, who had recently immigrated from France to Louisiana. René Chouteau was described as an innkeeper, liquor dealer, and pastry chef. He was born in the village of L'Hermenault in September 1723, and was nearly ten years older than Bourgeois. Auguste Chouteau was the only child of Marie-Thérèse and René, born in either September 1749 or September 1750. René purportedly abused Marie-Thérèse, and abandoned her and René, so she returned to her pre-matrimonial home, which some scholars say was the convent and others say was her step-father's and mother's house. In either case, a child named René was baptized on 7 September 1749 at the St. Louis Parish Church in New Orleans, with parents listed as René Chouteau and Marie Bourgeois. However, the Auguste Chouteau who founded St. Louis, Missouri, often was referred to as René-Auguste, but his birth date was listed in family records as September 26, 1750. Family members in the 19th century used the traditional date (September 26, 1750) for Chouteau's grave marker in Calvary Cemetery. In René Chouteau's will, he referred to two living sons in 1776. Thus, it is possible a second son existed. In that case, it is likely that the second son died after René Chouteau left Louisiana.

By 1758, Marie-Thérèse (known as Madame Chouteau or Widow Chouteau) had met and began living with Pierre Laclède Liguest (commonly known as Laclède) in a common-law marriage. Kieran Doherty suggests that Laclède informally adopted Auguste Chouteau, providing him with an education in one of the Catholic schools of New Orleans. Regardless of whether formal education was provided Chouteau, it was clear that by his early teens, he had a respect for learning and some form of education (possibly under the direct tutelage of Laclède). By the early 1760s, Chouteau worked as an assistant in obtaining supplies for Laclède's partnership business with Gilbert Antoine de St. Maxent, and served as a clerk in Laclède's journey up the Mississippi River to establish another fur-trading post.

Though highly influenced by Laclède, many historians have also commented on his mother's character and intelligence that proved to be exceptionally important throughout his entire life. With a strong business sense and acumen, she would have helped developed his senses that later proved to be very effective and helpful in later years.

== Settlement of St. Louis ==
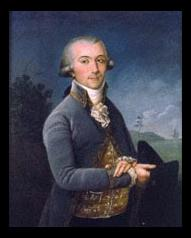
Pierre Laclède, stepfather of Auguste Chouteau and co-founder of St. Louis

Maxent and Laclède formed a partnership in the early 1760s to build a French trading post on the west bank of the Mississippi River north of the village of Ste. Genevieve, Missouri. They began buying supplies in early 1763, and on July 6, 1763, they obtained the necessary license from the French territorial government to trade with the Native Americans, primarily those living near the Missouri River. Starting in August 1763, Chouteau, Laclède and some 30 other men traveled upriver from New Orleans to Sainte Geneviève with trade goods. By November, the group arrived at Sainte Geneviève, but Laclède found that the village did not have adequate storage for his goods. As it had been settled near the riverbank on bottomland, Laclède "deemed the location insalubrious" for his business. After repeated flooding, in the 1780s the residents relocated Sainte Geneviève upriver and inland to higher ground.

The French garrison just across the river at Fort de Chartres agreed to store the goods until the British arrived. Following the Seven Years' War, France conceded territory and installations to the victorious British. The fort was to be turned over to the British according to the Treaty of Paris (1763). The commandant of Illinois, Pierre-Joseph Neyon de Villiers, suggested French settlers should relocate from the Illinois Country to New Orleans. He thought it would be under French control, as he did not know of the Treaty of Fontainebleau (1762) to give control of the area west of the Mississippi to the Spanish. Because of the postwar upheaval, "instead of just establishing a trading post at the mouth of the Missouri, [Laclède] would create an entire community." Laclède believed he could convince many French to move to the west bank of the Mississippi at his new settlement. He planned to store the goods until spring, and then have Chouteau and his team build the trading post at the site they selected in December 1763. As Chouteau wrote, Laclède said, "You will come here as soon as navigation opens, and will cause this place to be cleared, in order to form our settlement after the plan that I shall give you."

In the late winter, Chouteau fitted out a boat and led a party of 30 men across the river, where they landed on February 14, 1764. The next day, February 15, Chouteau directed the men to start clearing and founded the European city of St. Louis. It was on a site long occupied by indigenous tribes, as demonstrated by the numerous massive earthwork mounds left from the Mississippian culture of the 9th–12th centuries.

Laclède was at Fort de Chartres until early April, recruiting French settlers from the east side villages. Because of a large migrating band of Osage, Laclède went to St. Louis to negotiate their departure from the fledgling post. Within months, Laclède had built a home for his common-law wife Marie-Thérèse, who traveled to the outpost from New Orleans, arriving in September 1764. Auguste Chouteau lived here until his death. Marie-Thérèse had an additional four children by Pierre Laclède, but under the surname of Chouteau. This includes three girls and a boy, Jean Pierre Chouteau, who later became a partner with Auguste in business and politics.

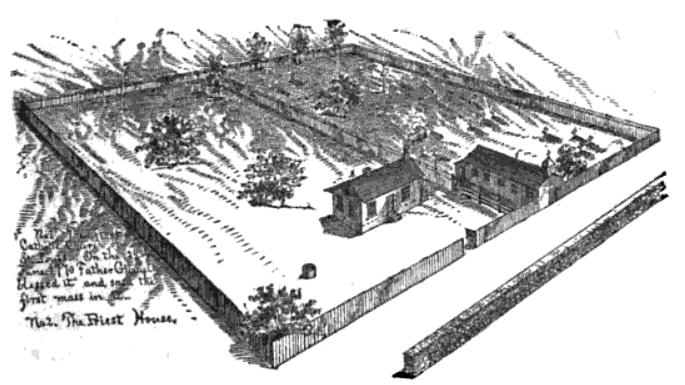
The first Catholic church in St. Louis, where Auguste Chouteau married Marie-Thérèse Cerre in 1786

After Laclède's death in 1778, Chouteau took over the business of trading, adding greatly to the family fortunes. He quickly expanded the business to include agricultural properties, and banking, and owned an early grist mill in St. Louis. He built the mill along Mill Creek in what became the Mill Creek Valley. Chouteau's Pond was a local attraction until 1852. Chouteau played a significant role in the growth of other, outlying towns, such as St. Charles, Missouri.

Chouteau also remained on good terms with the Spanish government in Saint Louis. In 1780, Chouteau played a small role in the Battle of St. Louis, in which the village was defended against a British-led Native American attack. Chouteau negotiated with the Spanish government for greater defense of the city, and for his efforts was commissioned a captain and later a colonel.

== Expansion of trade operations ==
In the early 1780s, Auguste Chouteau played a pivotal role in trade between the village and Native American nations in the Missouri, Kansas, and Osage valleys. His efforts to maintain peace and promote trade led him to establish (along with his brother, Pierre) numerous trading forts along the Missouri River.

His relationship with the Osage Nation became particularly important when, in 1787, the Spanish governor Esteban Miro ordered an end to trade with the Osage and began to prepare for war against them as a result of fighting between Osage and European settlers. Although the government continued its ban on trade with the Osage, Chouteau was able to defuse a conflict between Osage and Spanish-armed settlers through his intervention with Miro. With continuing problems between the Osage and the Spanish government, Chouteau maintained good relations with the tribe. Although the trade ban was lifted in 1791, problems continued among Mississippi tribes and the settlers, including horse theft and threatened attack on an Osage delegation in St. Louis by rival tribes of Sac, Fox, Kickapoo, Mascouten and Winnebago warriors.

In 1793, these problems culminated in an order from the Spanish Governor General Francisco Luis Héctor de Carondelet, in which all trade between settlers and tribes was to cease. Hector also ordered a military expedition against the Osage and other tribes. However, Hector was persuaded toward peace by an Osage delegation led by Chouteau to New Orleans in the spring of 1794. To convince Hector of peace, Chouteau promised a military fort built among the Osage at his own expense. In return, Chouteau was given a six-year monopoly on trade along the Osage River. After its construction in 1795, Fort Carondelet, although acting as a military base, was in practice a trading post for the Chouteau family. The fort also served as home to Chouteau's nephews, who gained valuable experience as traders. Through contacts at this post, Chouteau also negotiated construction of a second trading post among the Osage, located on the Verdigris River in eastern Kansas from 1795 to 1797.

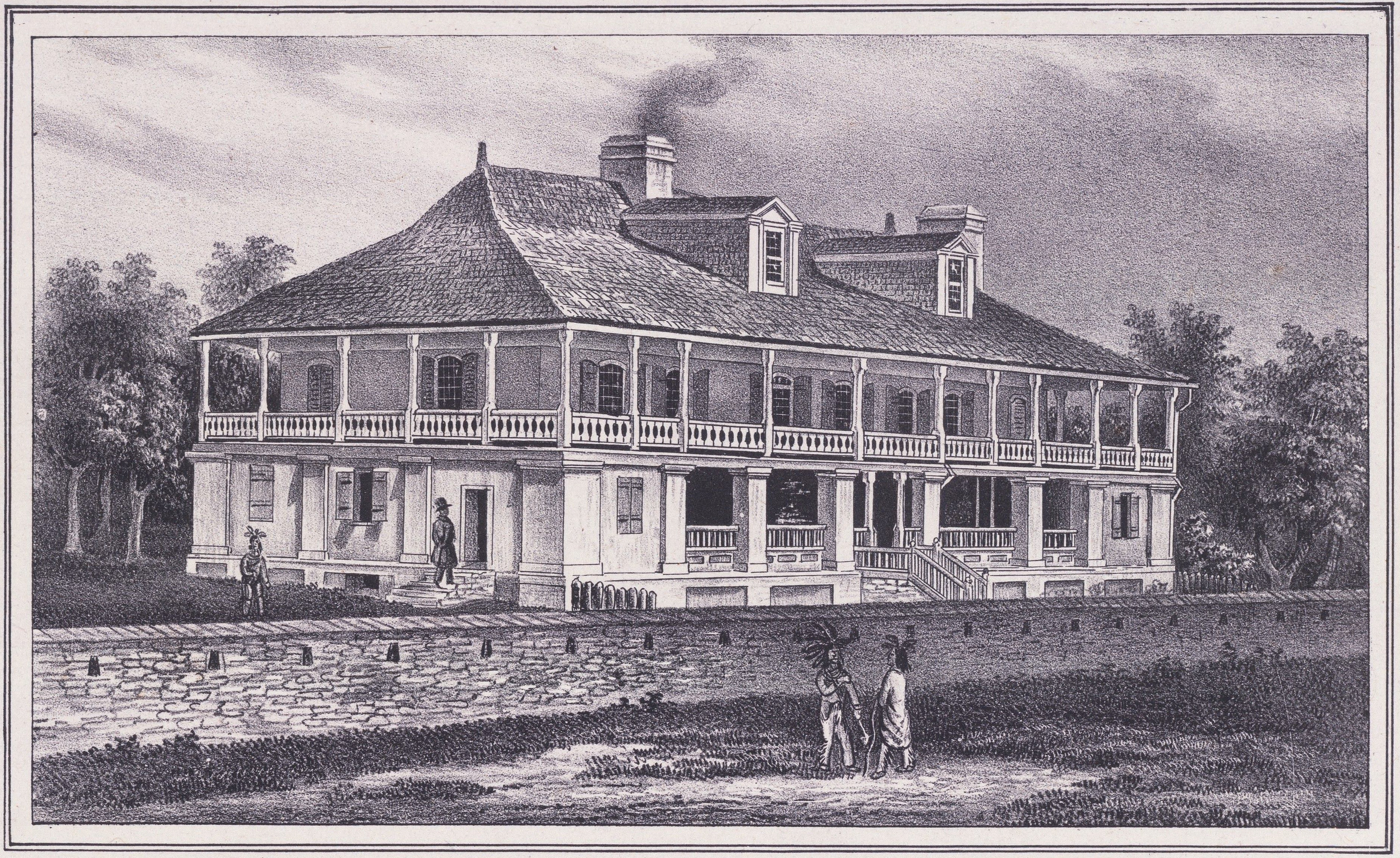
The home of Auguste Chouteau in St. Louis, where Lewis and Clark stayed and purchased supplies for their 1803 expedition

However, in 1799, new Spanish Governor General Manuel María de Salcedo began favoring a Spanish businessman instead of the Chouteau fur operation. Fort Carondelet was sold to the Spanish firm, but Chouteau continued trade with the Osage on the Verdigris. Yet the Spanish competition was short-lived, as the Louisiana Territory was transferred first to France in 1800, then the United States in 1803. Late that year, Chouteau provided valuable information to the Lewis and Clark Expedition about the population of the Louisiana territory, along with observations of wildlife and local villages. In early 1804, Lewis and Clark purchased materials from Chouteau's trading house in St. Louis, and on March 9, 1804, Chouteau hosted the new American commander of the Upper Louisiana during the transfer ceremonies for the Louisiana Purchase. For this, Chouteau was rewarded with a return to his monopoly on trade with the tribes by the United States. From 1806 to 1815, Chouteau continued leading family fur trade business, eventually negotiating part of the Treaties of Portage des Sioux in 1815 after the War of 1812. In 1816, Auguste Chouteau retired from his trading businesses. Still active in Indian issues in 1817, Chouteau served as a U.S. Commissioner of Indian Affairs with William Clark in the first U.S. treaty with the Ponca tribe.

== Family and death ==
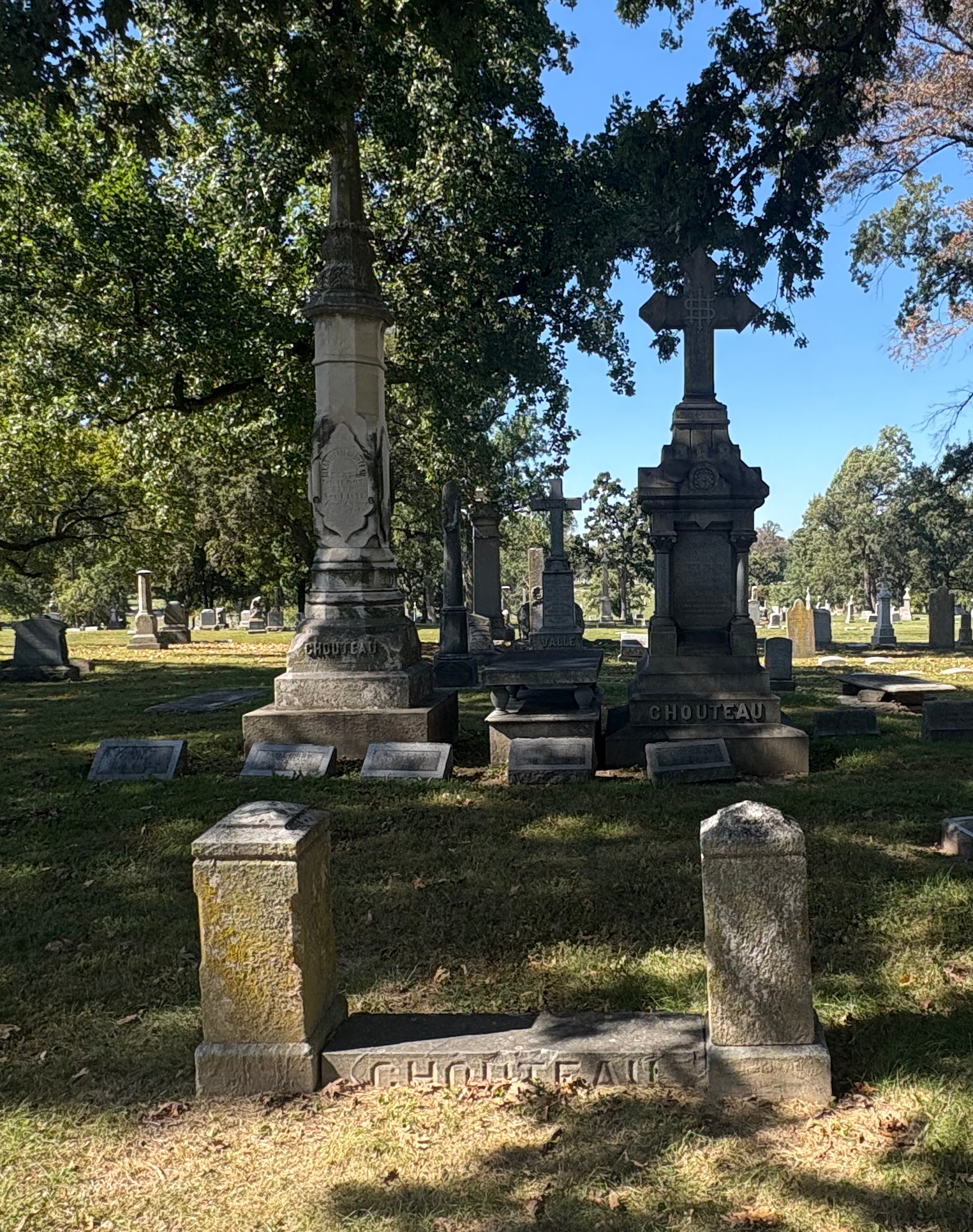
Chouteau's grave at Calvary Cemetery

Auguste Chouteau kept his residence in the St. Louis area, although he had numerous lengthy trading journeys up the Missouri to his outer posts and to trade with Native Americans, mostly Osage. In the 1760s and early 1770s, Chouteau likely fathered two enslaved Native American children, whose mothers were owned by his mother. The enslaved Native American mothers, Therese and Manon, gave birth to sons Jean-Baptiste and Alexis. In the 1760s and 1770s, he took at least one wife among the Osage, a standard practice among furtraders. In the 1780s, Chouteau also had some type of long-term affair with Native American Marie, while she was enslaved by Lieutenant Governor Francisco Cruzat. They bore two children, son Auguste and daughter Victoire. Chouteau's children by Native American women were likely emancipated and worked in his extended fur trade enterprise. Chouteau married Marie Thérèse, the daughter of Jean-Gabriel Cerré, on September 21, 1786, at the Basilica of St. Louis, King of France (then a vertical-log church, not the current church on the site). The apparently happy marriage united members of the two leading St. Louis families. They were renowned for their hospitality, which helped strengthen his political position in the city and region.

Chouteau died on February 24, 1829. His remains were interred first at the burial grounds near the Basilica of St. Louis, but were reinterred at Calvary Cemetery. After his death, 22 of his 36 slaves were sold at probate, providing US$10,838.88 (equivalent to $328,000 in 2025) in proceeds, half of which was provided to his wife, with the other half being divided equally among their seven children.

The children of Auguste Chouteau and Marie Thérèse Cerré were as follows:

- Auguste Aristide Chouteau (1792–1833), fur trader
- Gabriel Chouteau (1794–1887), served in War of 1812
- Marie Thérèse Eulalie Chouteau (1799–1835), married René Paul, first surveyor of St. Louis
- Henry Chouteau (1805–1855), railroad executive, killed in Gasconade Bridge train disaster
- Edward Chouteau (1807–1846), trader
- Louise Chouteau, married Gabriel Paul, brother of René Paul
- Emilie Chouteau, married Thomas Floyd, officer in the Black Hawk War
