= Jean-Gabriel Cerré =

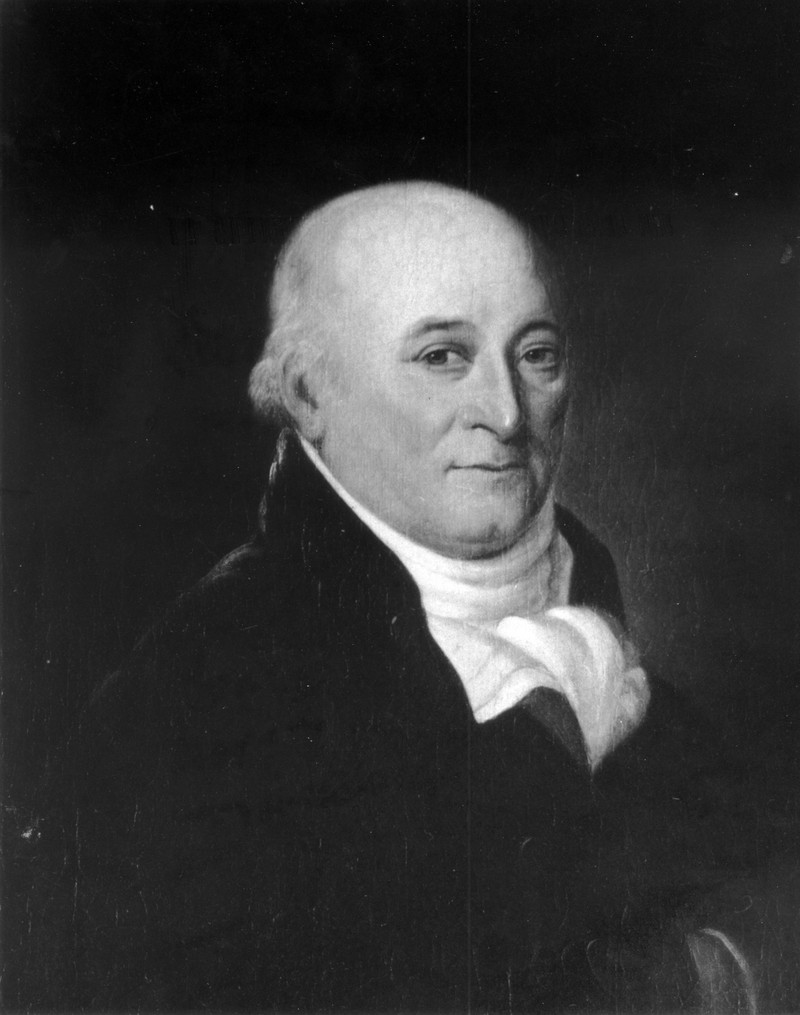
Portrait of Jean Gabriel Cerre

Jean-Gabriel Cerré (August 12, 1734 – April 4, 1805) was a Quebec-born merchant in the Illinois Country and St. Louis.

The son of Joseph Serré and Marie-Madeleine Picard, he was born in Montreal. Cerré established himself in Kaskaskia as a merchant in 1755 but retained business and personal connections with Montreal. He was pragmatic in his politics, supporting the British authorities while they were in control and transferring his loyalties to the Americans after George Rogers Clark seized control of the region. In 1779, he was named a justice of the peace for the district. However, the new government was not able to maintain order and, around the end of 1779, he moved to St. Louis, then under Spanish control. His business prospered and he became one of the wealthiest and most influential persons in the area. Control of the Louisiana territory later passed to France, who sold it to the United States in 1803. Cerré died in St. Louis two years later at the age of 70.

Cerre Street in St. Louis was named after Jean-Gabriel Cerré.

== Personal life ==
His daughter Marie-Anne married Pierre-Louis Panet, a Montreal notary, and his daughter Marie-Thérèse married Auguste Chouteau, founder of St. Louis. Julia, his youngest daughter, donated to St. Louis the land that is now Soulard Farmers Market. Julia married Antoine Pierre Soulard, the king's surveyor for the upper Louisiana territory.
