= Territorial evolution of New Mexico =

Geographic chronology of New Mexico

Location of the State of New Mexico in the United States of America.

The area currently occupied by the U.S. State of New Mexico has undergone numerous changes in occupancy and territorial claims and designations. This geographic chronology traces the territorial evolution of New Mexico.

== Timeline ==
- Pueblo city-states and nomadic Apache and Navajo.
- Historical territorial claims of Spain in the present State of New Mexico:
  - Nueva Vizcaya, 1562–1821
  - Santa Fe de Nuevo México, 1598–1680; 1692-1821
    - Treaty of Córdoba of 1821
- Pueblo republic, 1680-1692
- Historical territorial claims of France in the present State of New Mexico:
  - Louisiane, 1682–1764
    - Treaty of Fontainebleau of 1762
- Historical territorial claims of Spain in the present State of New Mexico:
  - Luisiana, 1764–1803
    - Third Treaty of San Ildefonso of 1800
- Historical territorial claims of France in the present State of New Mexico:
  - Louisiane, 1803
    - Vente de la Louisiane of 1803
- Historical territorial claims of Mexico in the present State of New Mexico:
  - Santa Fé de Nuevo México, 1821–1848
    - Treaty of Guadalupe Hidalgo of 1848
- Historical territorial claims of the Republic of Texas in the present State of New Mexico:
  - Disputed territory east of the Rio Grande, 1836–1845
    - Texas Annexation of 1845
- Historical political divisions of the United States in the present State of New Mexico:
  - Unorganized territory created by the Louisiana Purchase, 1803–1804
  - District of Louisiana, 1804–1805
  - Territory of Louisiana, 1805–1812
  - Territory of Missouri, 1812–1821
  - Territory of Arkansaw, 1819–1836
    - Adams–Onís Treaty of 1819
  - Disputed territory created by the Texas Annexation, 1845–1850
    - Compromise of 1850
  - Mexican–American War, 1846–1848
    - U.S. Military Province of New Mexico, 1846
    - U.S. Provisional Government of New Mexico 1846–1850
  - Unorganized territory created by the Treaty of Guadalupe Hidalgo, 1848–1850
  - State of Deseret (extralegal), 1849–1850
  - Proposed state of New Mexico, 1850
  - Territory of New Mexico, 1850–1912
    - Gadsden Purchase of 1853
    - American Civil War, 1861–1865
      - Arizona Territory (CSA), 1861–1865
  - State of New Mexico since 1912

== Maps ==
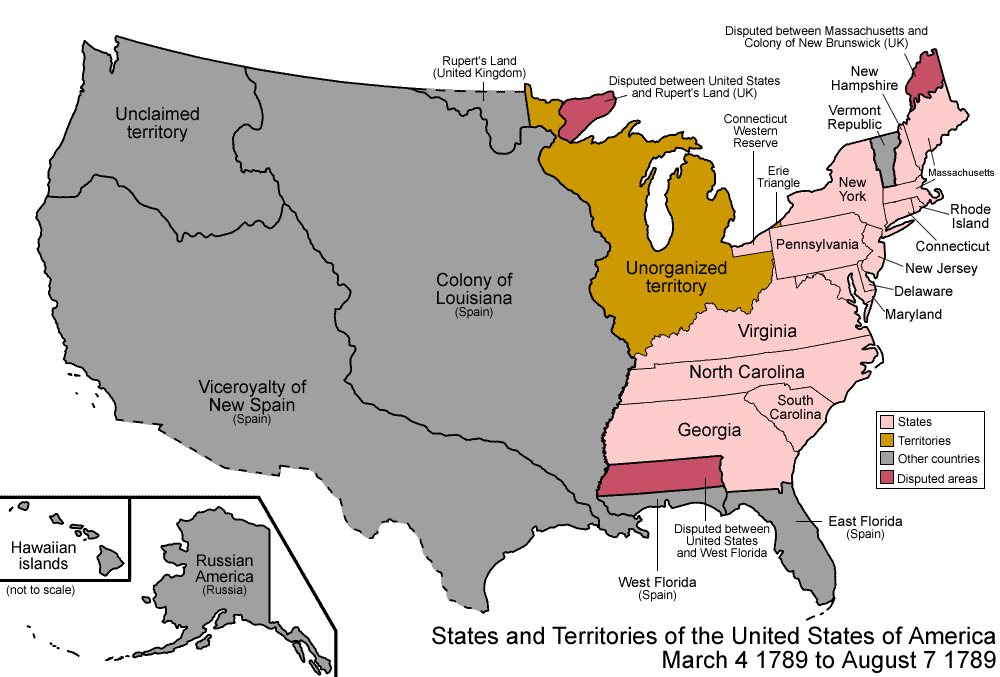
An enlargeable map of the United States after the Constitution of the United States was ratified on March 4, 1789.

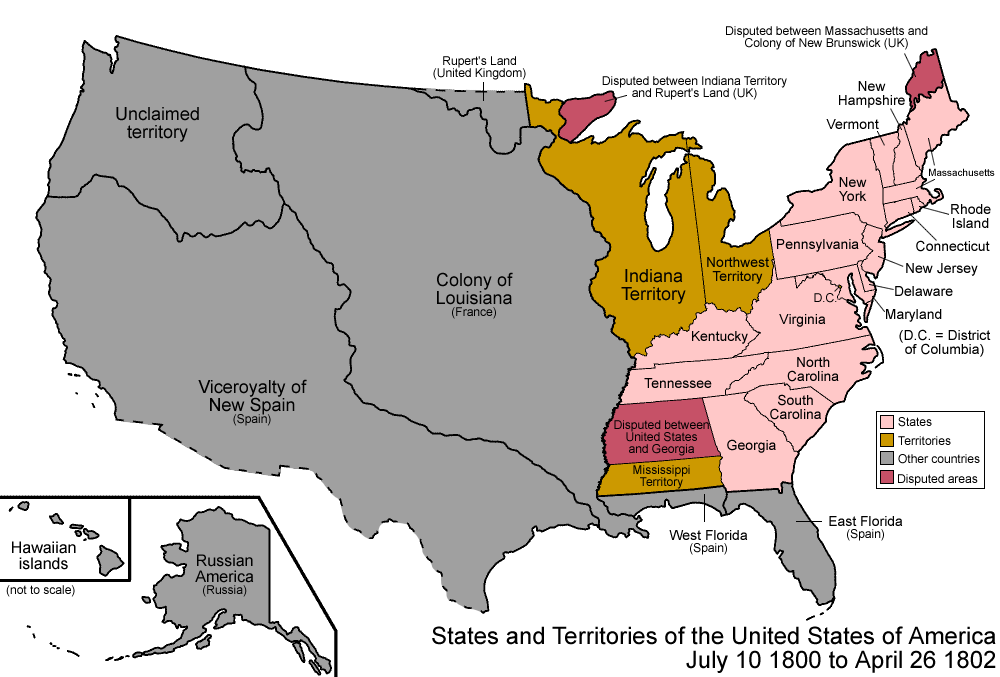
An enlargeable map of the United States after the secret Third Treaty of San Ildefonso transferred the Spanish colony of la Luisiana to the French Republic on October 1, 1800.

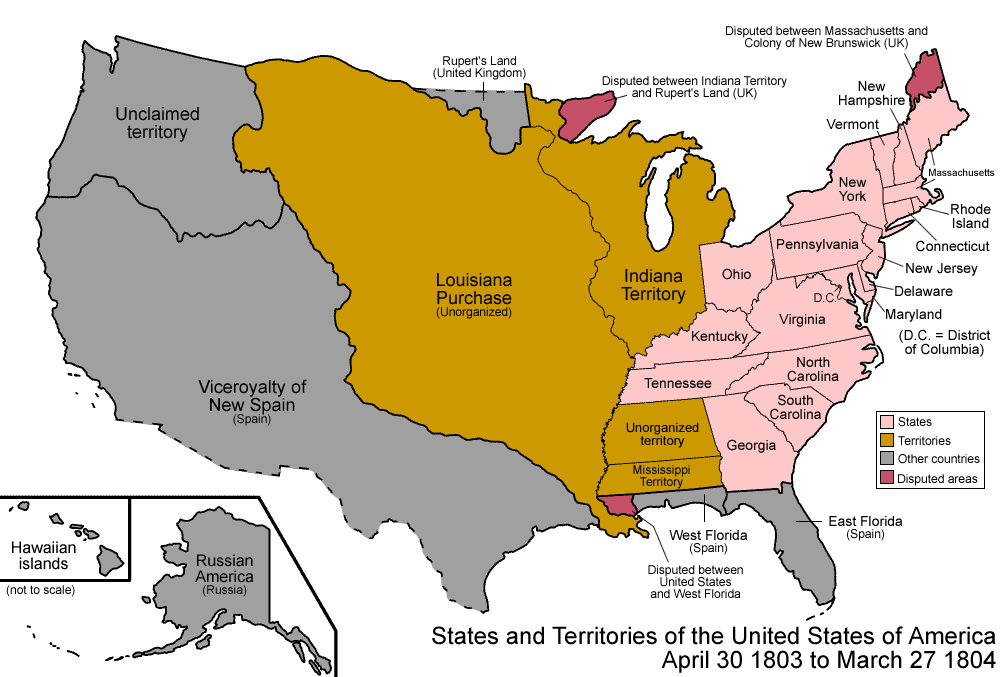
An enlargeable map of the United States after the Louisiana Purchase took effect on December 20,1803.

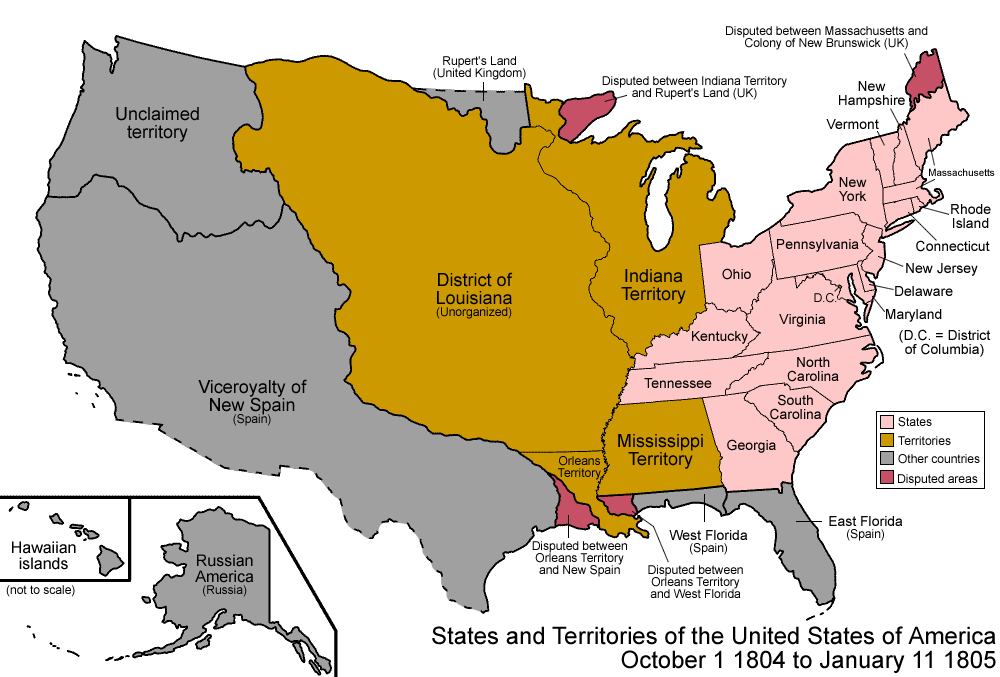
An enlargeable map of the United States after the creation of the District of Louisiana on March 26, 1804.

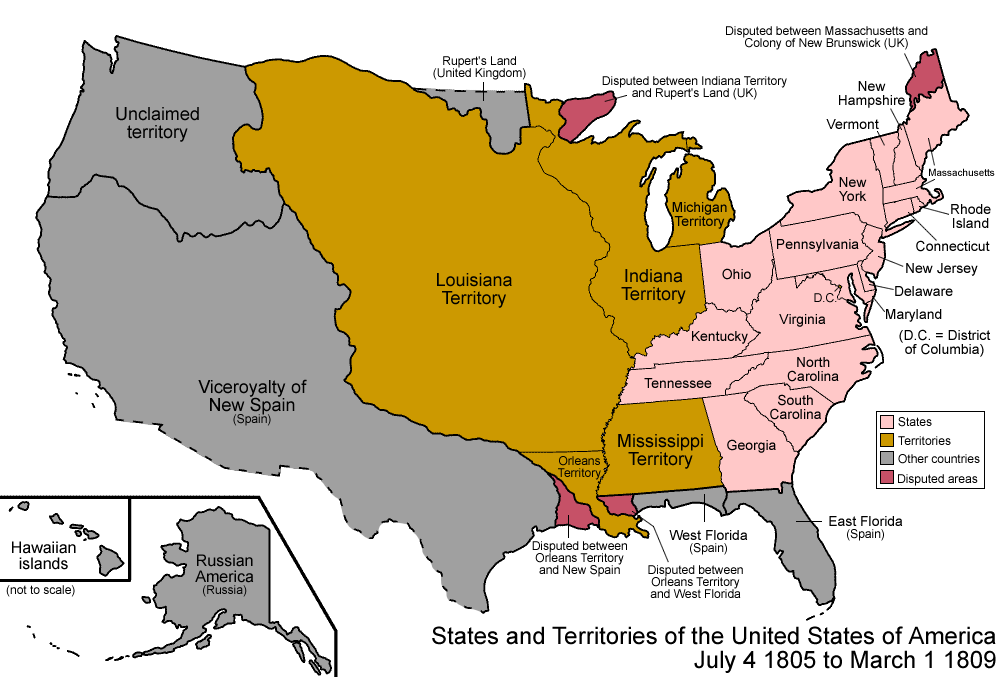
An enlargeable map of the United States after the creation of the Territory of Louisiana on March 3, 1805.

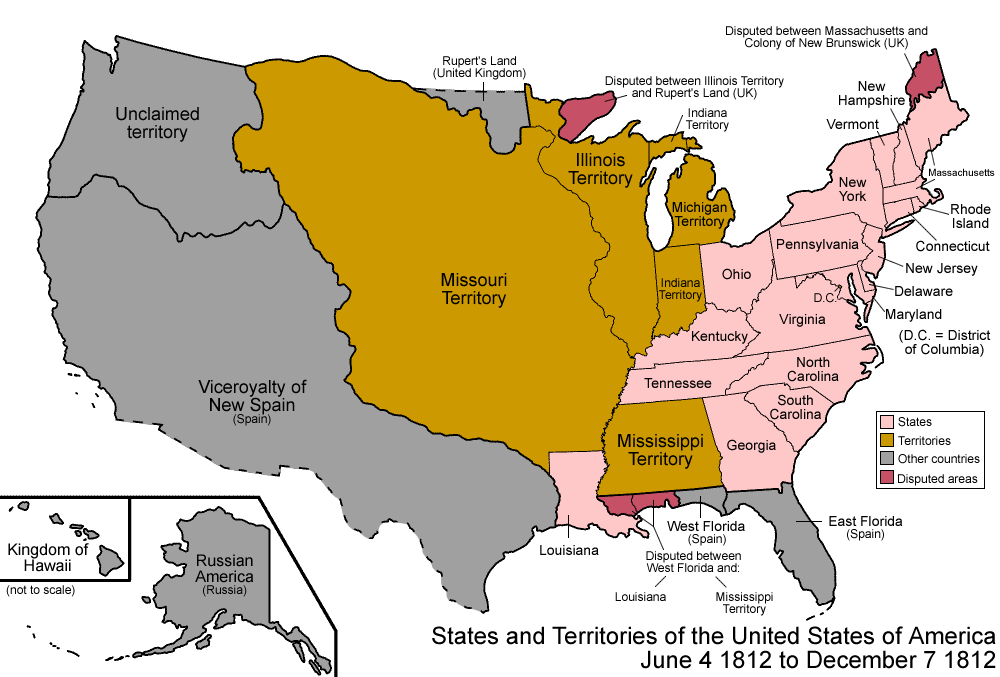
An enlargeable map of the United States after the creation of the Territory of Missouri on June 4, 1812.

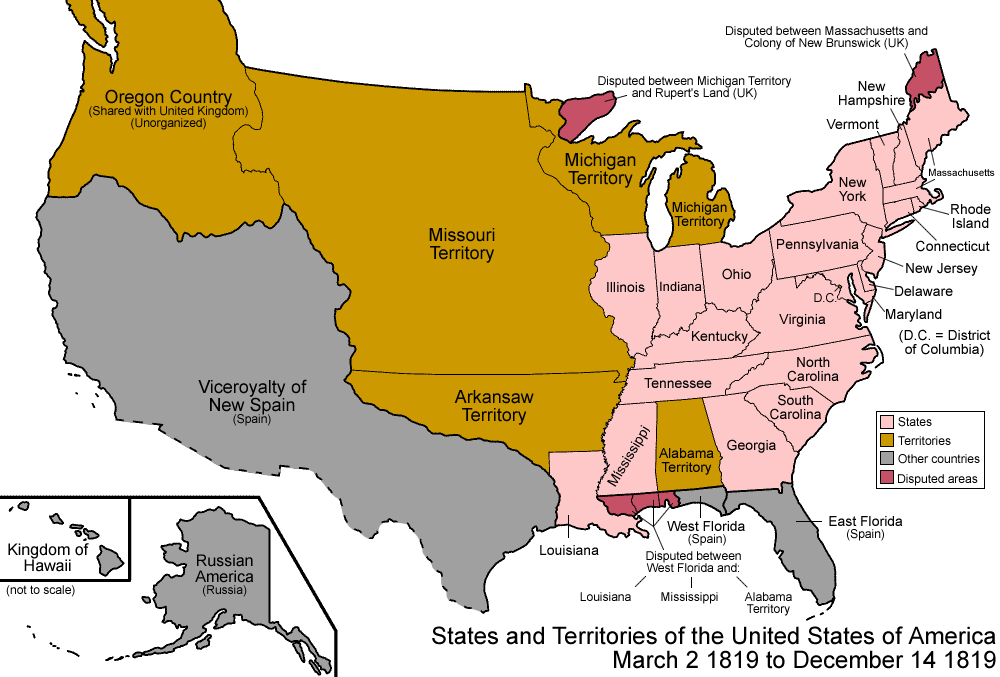
An enlargeable map of the United States after the creation of the Territory of Arkansaw on March 2, 1819.

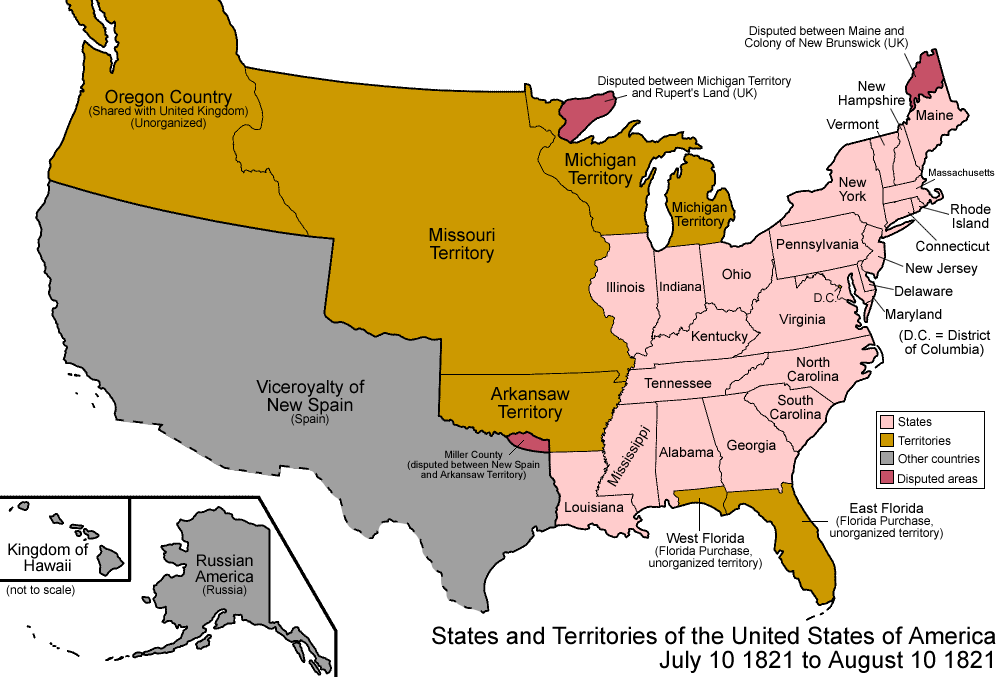
An enlargeable map of the United States after the Adams–Onís Treaty took effect on February 22, 1821.

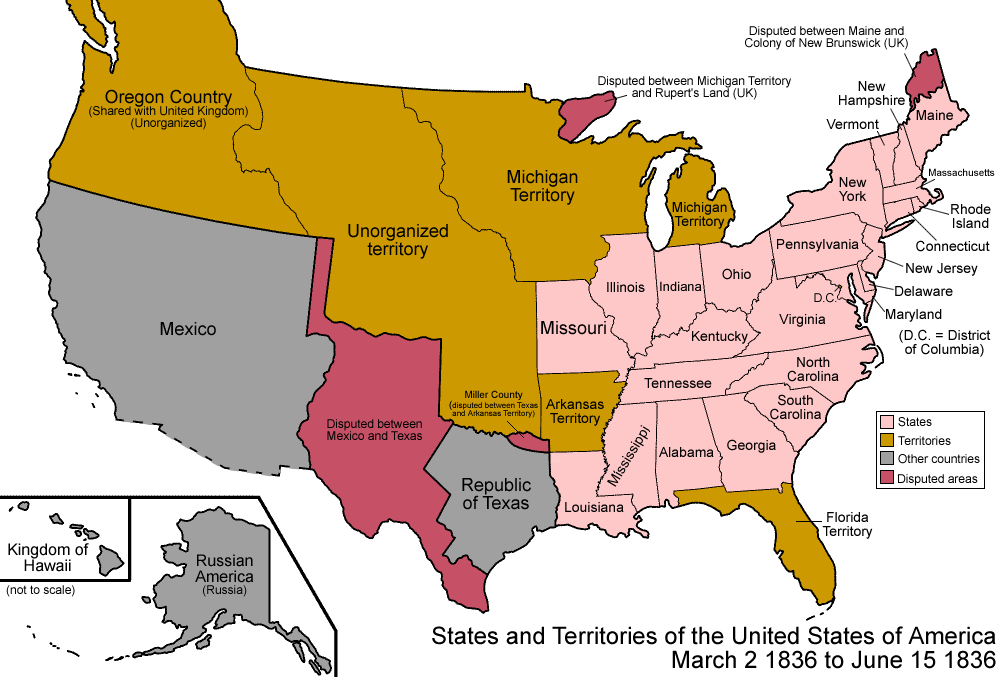
Territorial claims of the Republic of Texas, May 2, 1836.

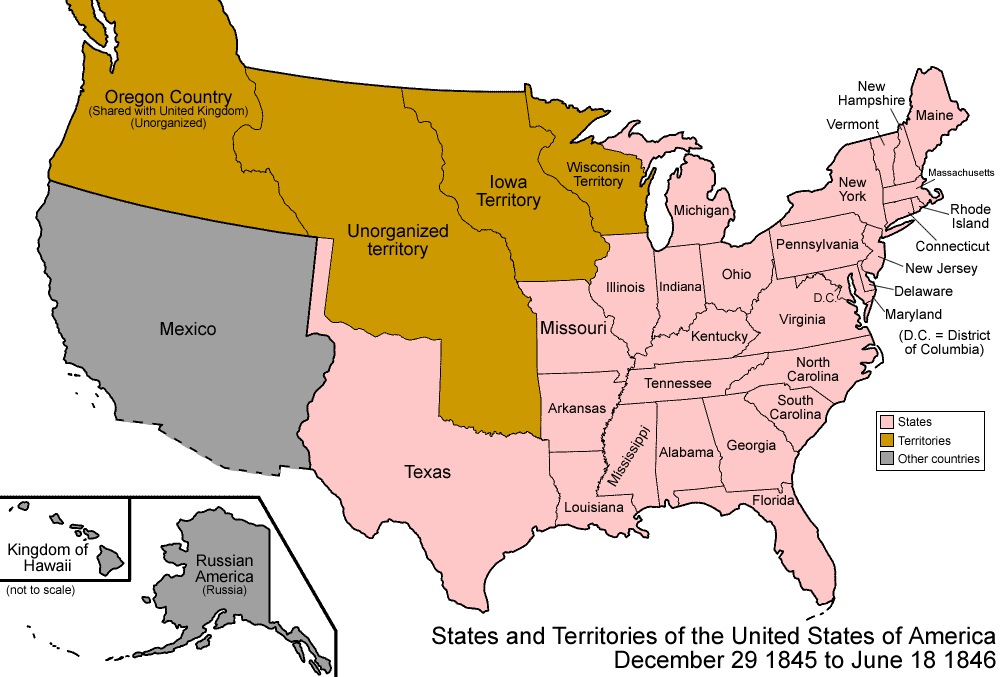
An enlargeable map of the United States after Texas was admitted to the Union on December 29, 1845.

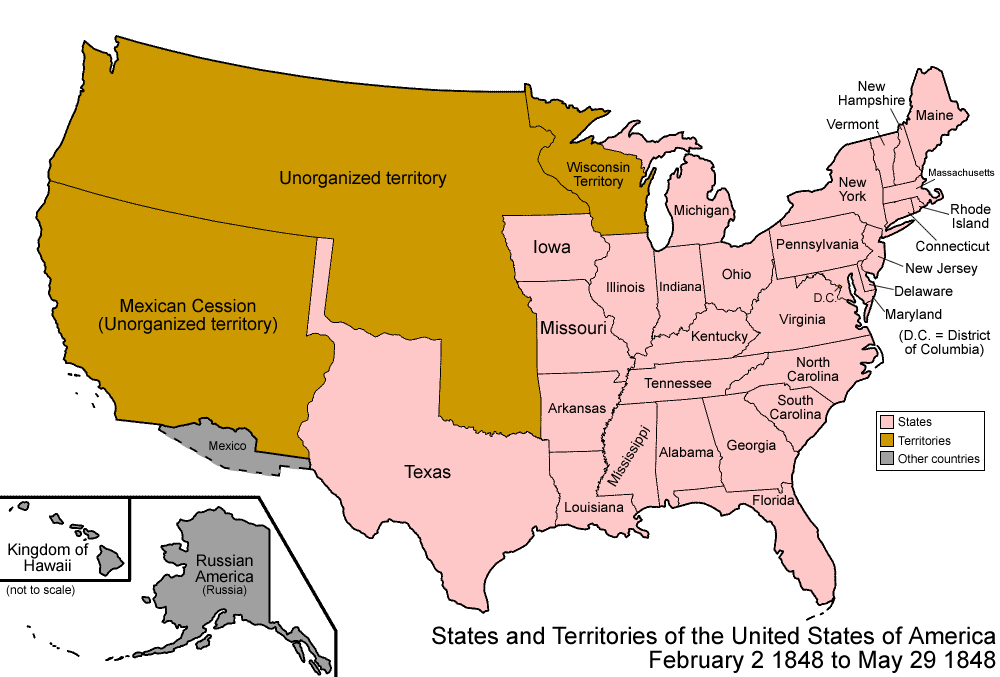
An enlargeable map of the United States after the Treaty of Guadalupe Hidalgo was signed on February 2, 1848.

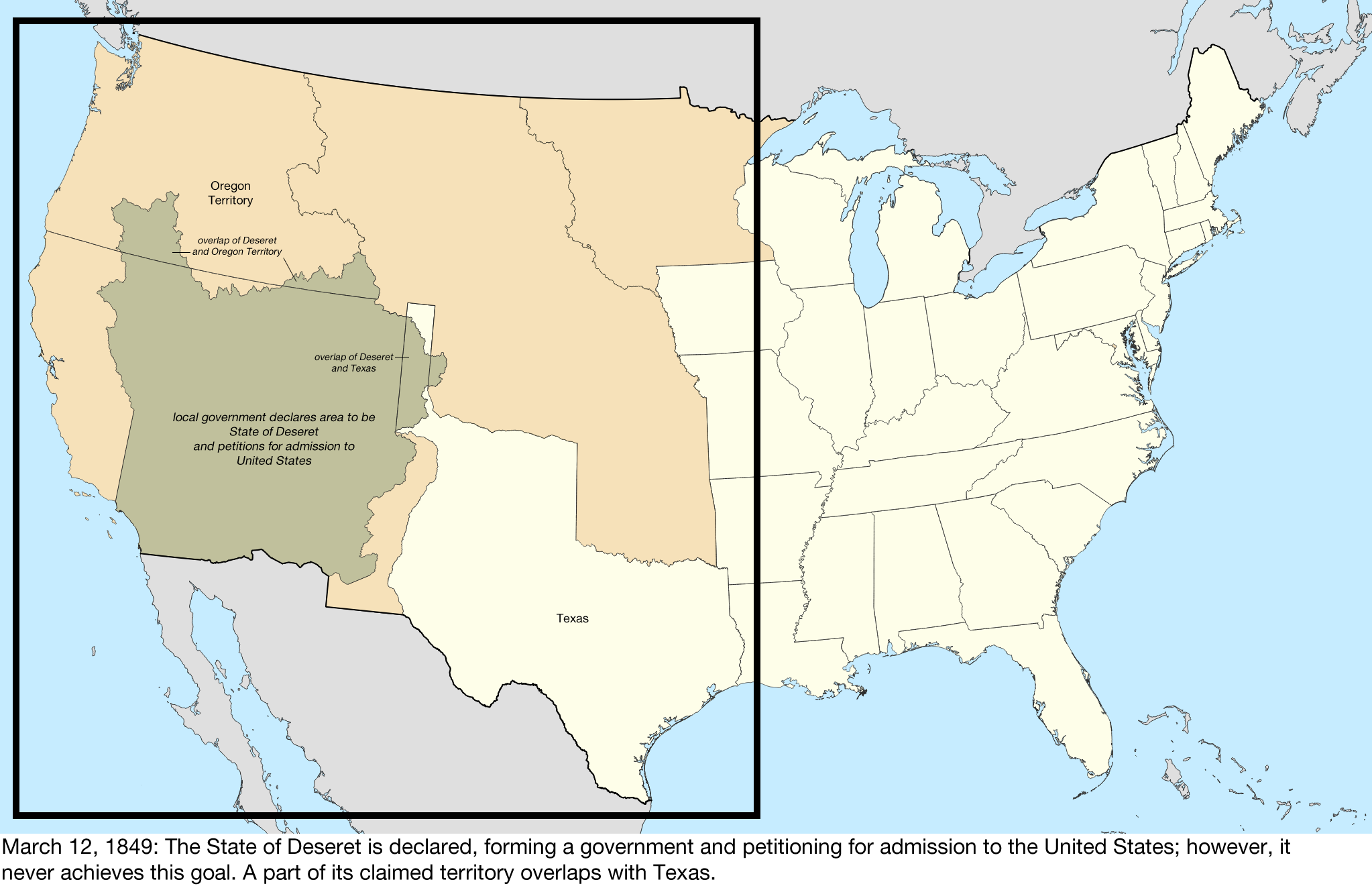
An enlargeable map of the United States after the creation of the provisional State of Deseret on July 2, 1849.

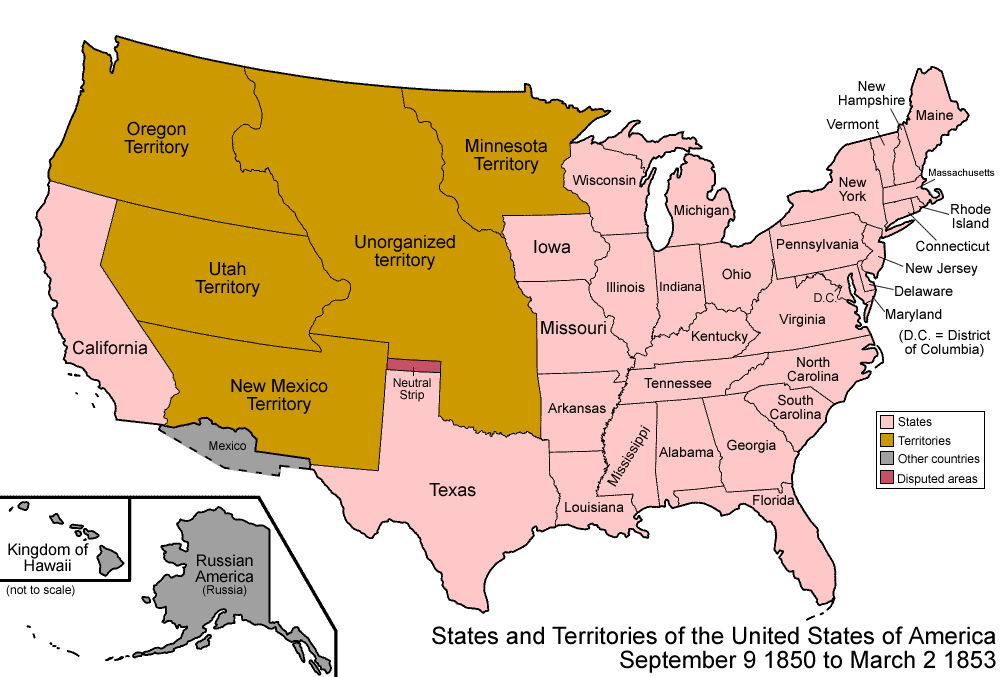
An enlargeable map of the United States after the creation of the Territory of New Mexico and the Territory of Utah on September 9, 1850.

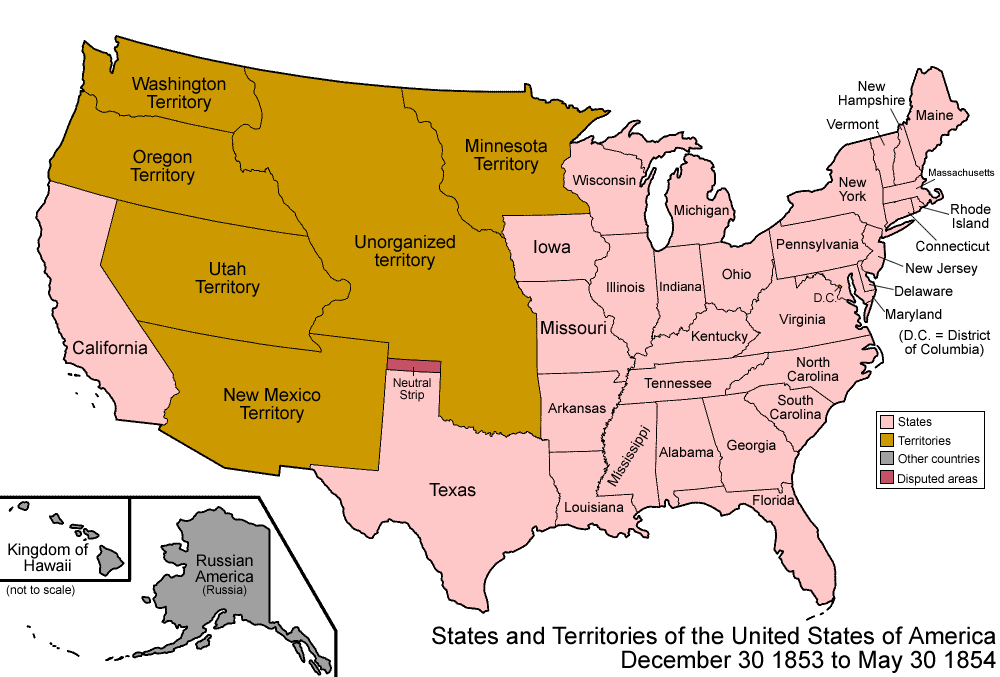
An enlargeable map of the United States after Gadsden Purchase on December 30, 1853.

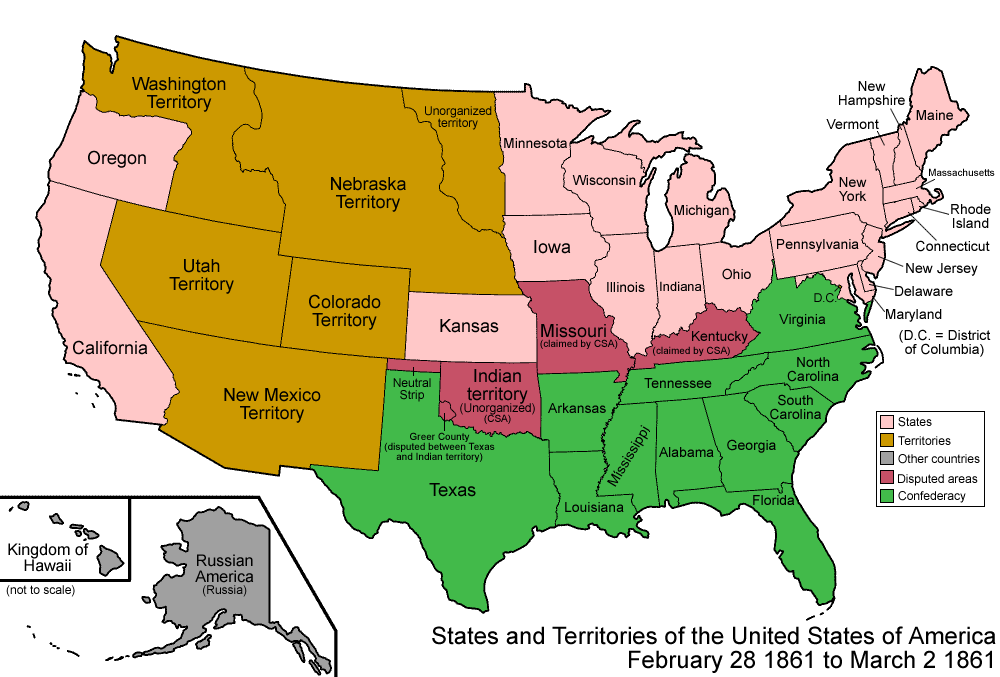
An enlargeable map of the United States after the creation of the Territory of Colorado on February 28, 1861.

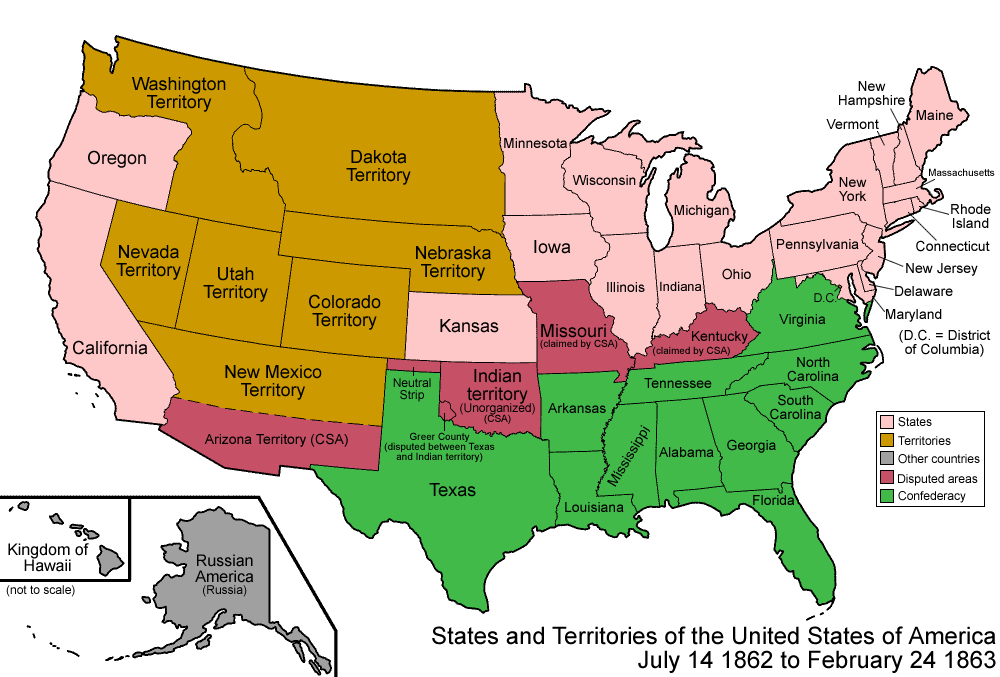
An enlargeable map of the United States after the creation of the Confederate Territory of Arizona on February 24, 1862.

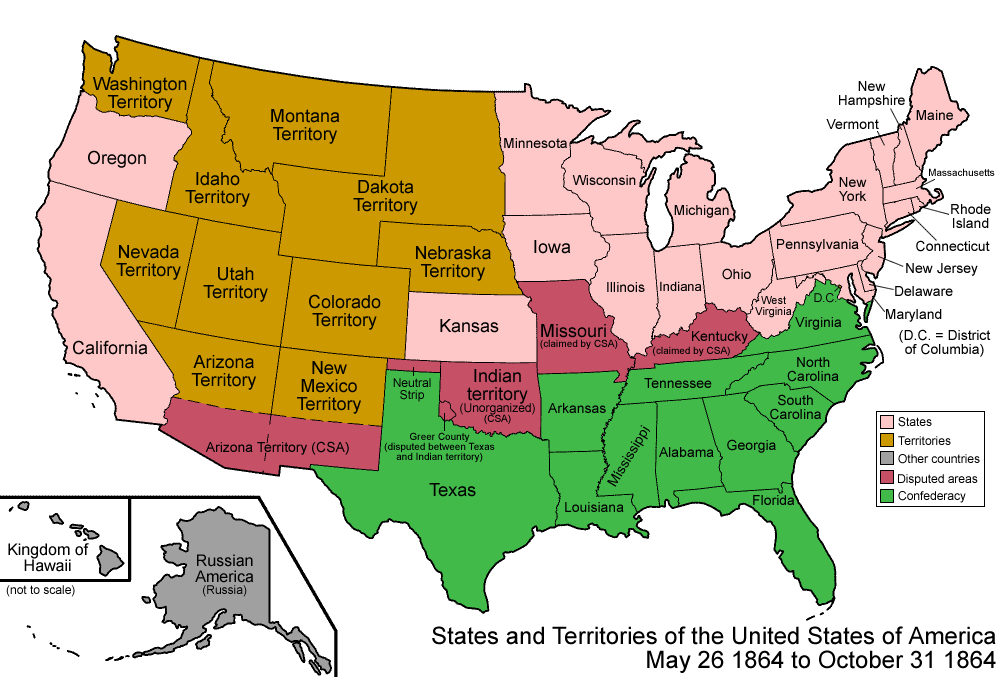
An enlargeable map of the United States after the creation of the Territory of Arizona on June 19, 1862.

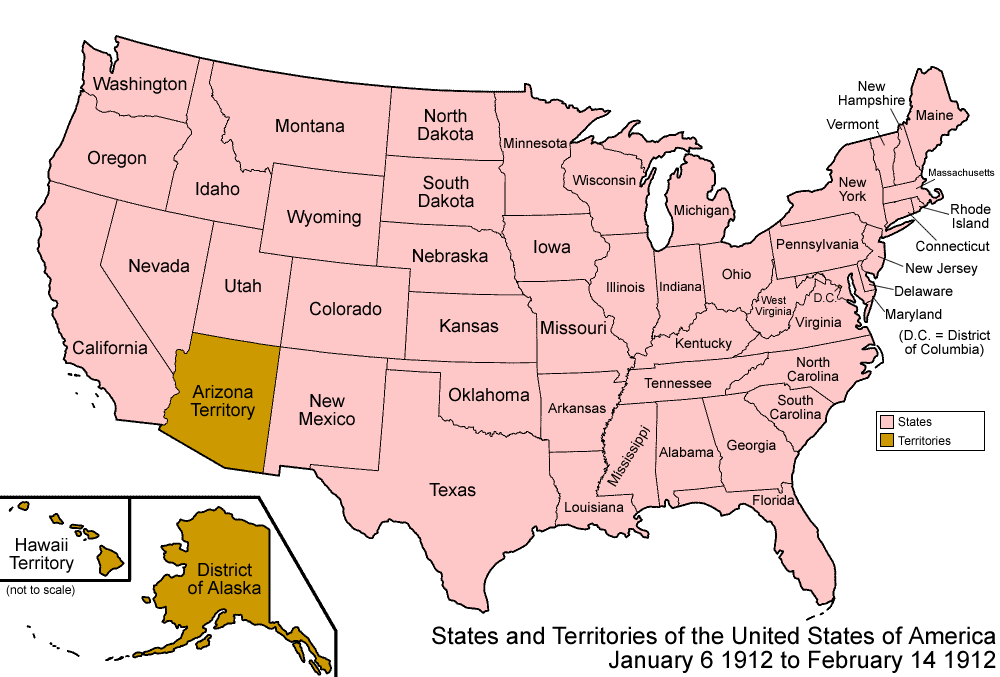
An enlargeable map of the United States after the admission of New Mexico to the Union on January 6, 1912.

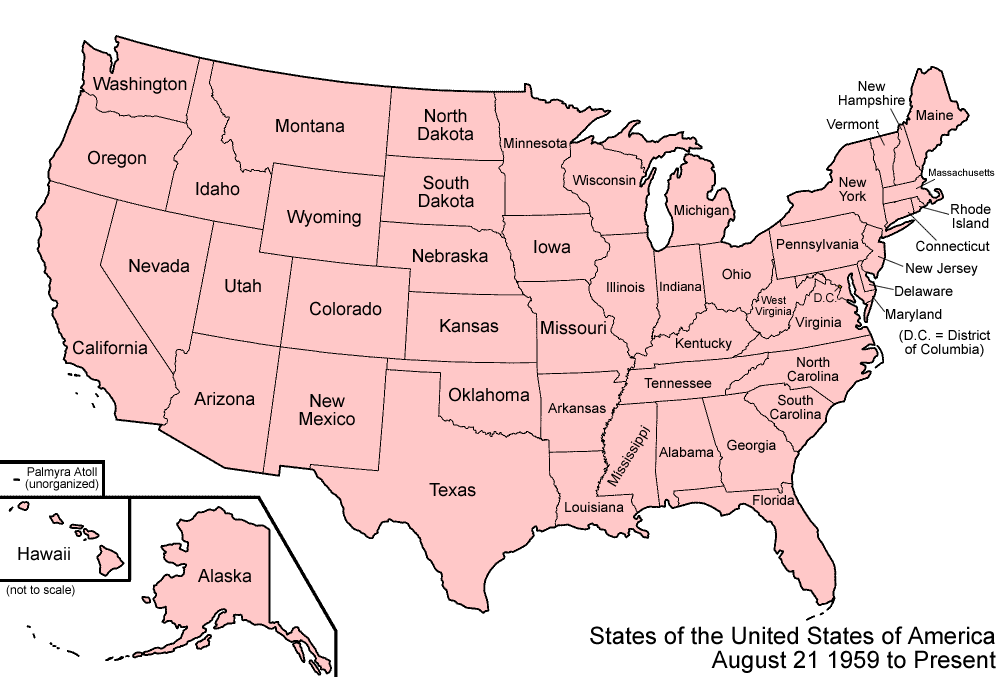
An enlargeable map of the United States as it has been since Hawaiʻi was admitted to the Union on August 21, 1959.

== See also ==
- History of New Mexico
  - Timeline of New Mexico history
- Indigenous peoples of the North American Southwest
- Territorial evolution of the United States

(Spain) Santa Fe de Nuevo México
(New France) La Louisiane
(Spain) La Luisiana
(United States) Louisiana Purchase
(United States) District of Louisiana
(Missouri) Louisiana Territory
(Arkansas) Arkansaw Territory
Missouri Territory
(Mexico) Mexican Empire
Republic of Texas
(United States) U.S. provisional government of New Mexico
(United States) State of Deseret
New Mexico Territory
(Confederate States of America) Confederate Territory of Arizona
State of New Mexico
