= Carlos de Hault de Lassus =

Spanish colonial official (1767–1813)

Don Carlos de Hault de Lassus
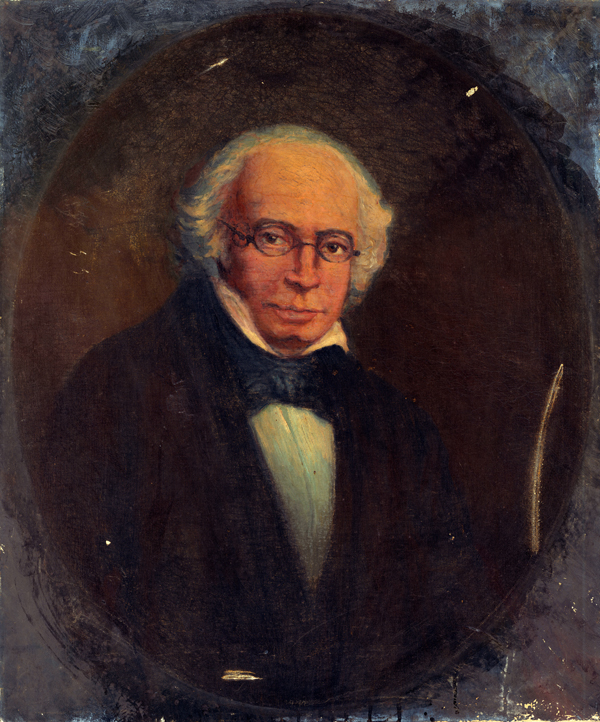
- 1916 portrait of de Lassus by Charles Wellington Boyle

Governor Baton Rouge District, West Florida
- In office 1807–1810
- Monarchs: Charles IV; Ferdinand VII
- Preceded by: Carlos de Grand Pré
- Succeeded by: Fulwar Skipwith as Governor of the Republic of West Florida

7th Lieutenant-Governor of Upper Louisiana
- In office 1799–1804
- Monarch: Charles IV
- Preceded by: Zénon Trudeau
- Succeeded by: Amos Stoddard as Commandant of the District of Louisiana

Personal details
- Born: Charles Auguste de Hault de Lassus; November 17, 1767 Bouchain, France
- Died: May 1, 1843 (aged 75) New Orleans, Louisiana, U.S.
- Resting place: Saint Louis Cemetery No.1
- Spouse: Adelayda Elena Feliciana Martina Leonard (m. 1811; died 1816)
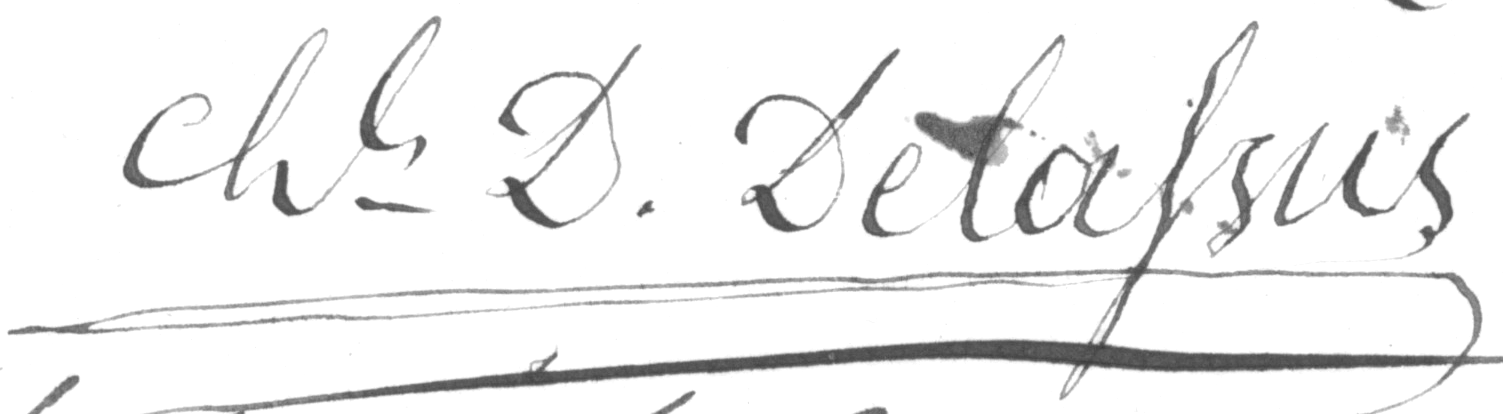
- Signature

Military service
- Allegiance: Kingdom of Spain; Viceroyalty of New Spain
- Branch/service: Spanish Army
- Years of service: 1782–1811
- Rank: Colonel
- Unit: Walloon Guards
- Battles/wars: War of the Pyrenees

Carlos de Hault de Lassus (Note: His surname is sometimes written with the de prefix attached to the following element in his name with varying capitalization, i.e., DeHault or Delassus.) (1767–1813) was the last lieutenant governor of Spanish Upper Louisiana (Alta Luisiana), overseeing the handover of St. Louis to the Americans after the sale of Louisiana. He later served briefly as the governor of the Baton Rouge District of West Florida at the time of the West Florida Controversy.

== Early life ==
De Lassus was born in Bouchain, France, to Pierre-Charles de Hault de Lassus, Marquis de Luzières, and Domitille-Joséphe Dumont Danzin de Beaufort. De Lassus's grandfather, Charles-Philippe, had been mayor of Bouchain and an advisor to Louis XVI. At the age of 15, de Lassus joined the Spanish army and rose to the rank of lieutenant colonel and earned a place in the Walloon Guards.

He became a second lieutenant of the Grenadiers of the Fifth Battalion, and when 29 was brevetted Lieutenant Colonel in recognition of his bravery in leading a successful assault upon and capturing Fort St. Elmo in the Pyrenees in 1793.

== Louisiana career ==
During the French Revolution, de Lassus's parents fled to Spanish Louisiana in 1791, settling in New Bourbon, an area near modern Ste. Genevieve, Missouri, set up by Louisiana Governor Baron de Carondelet to attract others fleeing the revolution.

Three years later, in 1794, de Lassus sought a transfer to Louisiana, arriving in New Orleans in 1794 and soon being appointed commandant at New Madrid. In New Madrid, his brother-in-law, Pierre Derbigny, served as his interpreter and secretary.

=== Alta Luisiana ===
In July 1799, he was appointed by Spanish authorities as lieutenant governor of Alta Luisiana, and commander of St. Louis, replacing Zénon Trudeau, reporting to the governors of Spanish Louisiana and the Captaincy General of Cuba. In 1802 he was promoted to the rank of colonel. His first act upon taking command in St. Louis was to order a population census of Upper Louisiana, which recorded 6,028 people—4,948 whites, 883 enslaved people, and 197 freedmen. Native Americans were not included in the census.

When the Lewis and Clark Expedition reached St. Louis in December 1803, de Lassus refused Meriwether Lewis permission to proceed up the Missouri River without first consulting his superiors. Lewis, established Camp Dubois to wait out the winter as de Lassus sought approval from his superiors, Casa Calvo and Juan Manuel de Salcedo. Permission arrived at the end of January 1804.

At the same time, moves were underway to support the transfer of Upper Louisiana to France and then to the United States under the terms of the Louisiana Purchase. In February 1804, de Lassus received via U.S. Army Capt. Amos Stoddard word from Casa Calvo and Salcedo regarding the transfer of St. Louis, as well as a message from French Prefect Pierre-Clément de Laussat that Stoddard would act as France's representative in the transfer. De Lassus began making the preparations and in March 1804 he oversaw the Three Flags Day ceremonies as power was transferred from Spain to France to the United States. He remained in St. Louis until October 1804, managing lingering details of the transfer until he received orders to convey his soldiers and munitions to New Orleans.

=== West Florida ===
His next posting was to succeeded Carlos de Grand Pré as Spanish governor of the Baton Rouge District in December 1808. In St. Louis, de Lassus had been considered an effective administrator, but in West Florida he was considered indecisive and unprepared.

Since the Sale of Louisiana, the western end of West Florida had been disputed territory. The Spanish had administrative control, but the Americans believed it had been included in the purchase. Planters in Feliciana complained that Spanish officials were corrupt and nonresponsive, and de Lassus felt the small garrison at Baton Rouge was woefully inadequate for maintaining order in the territory. The district faced pressures from multiple fronts, including American land claims, bandits, military deserters, hostile indigenous people, and people who had escaped enslavement. At the same time, rumors of a French Republican effort to take West Florida for France were circulating.

Feleciana planters, displeased with de Lassus's response to their concerns and accusing him of corruption, began organizing popular conventions in the summer of 1810. At the same time American interests were encouraging President James Madison to annex the Spanish territories. Although de Lassus initially worked with the conventions, by September 1810 the planters rejected continued negotiations with Spanish officials. On the morning of September 23, 1810, an armed group led by Philemon Thomas successfully captured Fort San Carlos in Baton Rouge, imprisoned de Lassus, and declared an independent Republic of West Florida.

Spanish officials blamed de Lassus for the loss of the Florida Parishes, holding a tribunal in Havana in June 1812. De Lassus had resigned his commission in 1811 and refused to participate in the inquiry. Ultimately, in August 1814, he was sentenced to death in absentia.

== Personal life ==
In 1811, he married Adelayda Elena Feliciana Martina Leonard (1791–1816), daughter of Don Gilberto Leonard, the treasurer of the army in the colony. They had one child, Auguste de Hault de Lassus (1813–1908), who lived to adulthood. After resigning his commission, de Lassus and his wife lived in New Orleans. After Adelayda died during childbirth in 1816, de Lassus returned to St. Louis where he purchased a farm. After about a decade, he returned to New Orleans, remaining there until his death in 1843 at the age of 78.

During his time in Upper Louisiana, de Lassus's father amassed considerable debts. In 1801, de Lassus calculated he had paid 7,425 piastres on behalf of his father since 1796. A second accounting in 1804 increased that sum to 16,300 piastres. Until his own death in 1843, de Lassus continued to work to pay off these family debts. According to official documents and letters, de Lassus held several people as slaves during his lifetime, both in St. Louis and New Orleans.
