= Louisiana Territory =

Territory of the United States of America from 1805 to 1812

Territory of Louisiana
- Organized incorporated territory of United States
- 1805–1812
- Flag of the United States

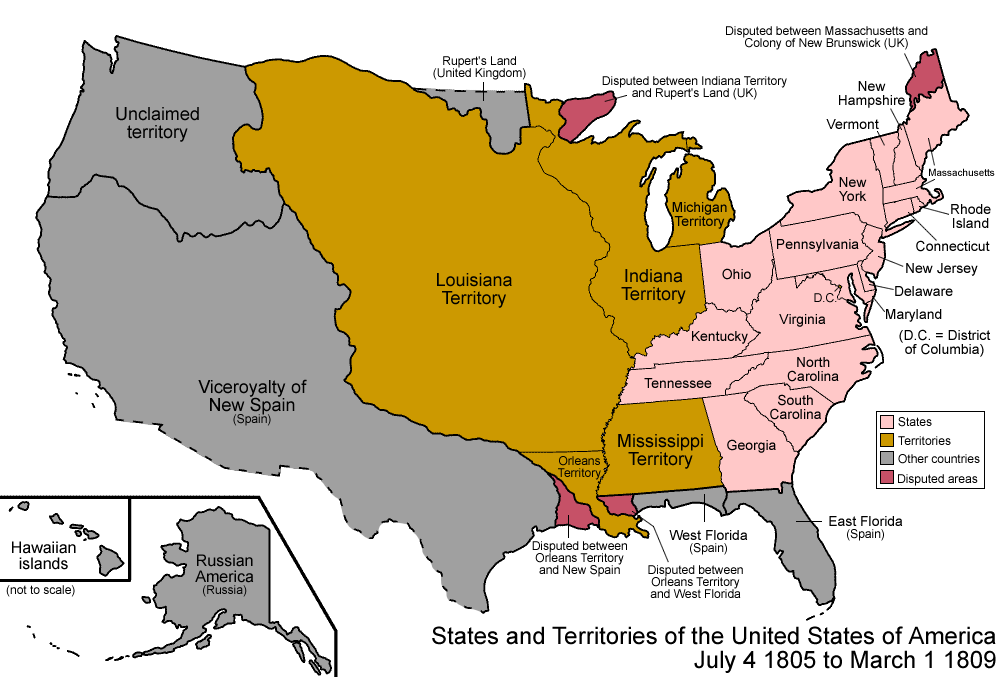
- Map of the Territory of Louisiana
- Capital: St. Louis
- Government
  - Type: Organized incorporated territory
- Governor
  - 1805–1807: James Wilkinson
  - 1807–1809: Meriwether Lewis
  - 1810–1812: Benjamin Howard
- History
  - Established: 4 July 1805
  - Renamed Territory of Missouri: 4 June 1812
Preceded by	Succeeded by
District of Louisiana	Missouri Territory

The Louisiana Territory, officially the Territory of Louisiana, was an organized incorporated territory of the United States spanning 828,000 mi^{2} (approx. 1,332,536 km^{2}) that existed from July 4, 1805, until June 4, 1812, when it was renamed the Missouri Territory. The territory was formed out of the District of Louisiana, which consisted of the portion of the Louisiana Purchase north of the 33rd parallel (which is now the Arkansas–Louisiana state line).

== Background ==
The Eighth Congress of the United States on March 26, 1804, passed legislation entitled "An act erecting Louisiana into two territories, and providing for the temporary government thereof," which established the Territory of Orleans and the District of Louisiana as organized incorporated U.S. territories. With regard to the District of Louisiana, this organic act, which went into effect on October 1, 1804, detailed the authority of the governor and judges of the Indiana Territory to provide temporary civil jurisdiction over the expansive region.

== Establishment ==
On March 3, 1805, Congress passed legislation changing the District of Louisiana into the Louisiana Territory, effective July 4, 1805.

== Boundaries ==
The Third Treaty of San Ildefonso was a secret agreement signed on 1 October 1800 between Spain and the French Republic by which Spain agreed in principle to exchange its North American colony of Louisiana for territories in Tuscany. The terms were later confirmed by the March 1801 Treaty of Aranjuez.

The Louisiana Territory included all of the land acquired by the United States in the Louisiana Purchase north of the 33rd parallel. The eastern boundary of the purchase, the Mississippi River, functioned as the territory's eastern limit. Its northern and western boundaries, however, were indefinite, and remained so throughout its existence. The northern boundary with the British territory of Rupert's Land was established by the Treaty of 1818, and the western boundary with the Spanish viceroyalty of New Spain was defined by the Adams–Onís Treaty of 1819.

== Subdivisions ==
The Louisiana Territory had five subdivisions: St. Louis District, St. Charles District, Ste. Genevieve District, Cape Girardeau District, and New Madrid District. In 1806, the territorial legislature created the District of Arkansas from lands ceded by the Osage Nation.

In the 1810 United States census, six counties in the Louisiana Territory, which included five counties in present-day Missouri and one county in present-day Arkansas, reported the following population counts:

Rank	County	Population
1	St. Louis	5,667
2	Ste. Genevieve	4,620
3	Cape Girardeau	3,888
4	St. Charles	3,505
5	New Madrid	2,103
6	Arkansas	1,062
	Louisiana Territory	20,845

== Government ==
The territorial capital was St. Louis.

On March 11, 1805, President Thomas Jefferson appointed Gen. James Wilkinson as the first governor of the Territory of Louisiana. Wilkinson concurrently held the position of Senior Officer of the United States Army. Meriwether Lewis (1807–1809) served as the 2nd and William Clark (1813–1820) served as the 4th, and final, territorial governor.

== Renaming ==
On June 4, 1812, the Twelfth U.S. Congress enacted legislation which renamed Louisiana Territory as Missouri Territory, in order to avoid confusion with the recently admitted State of Louisiana.

== Current states ==
The areas of the Louisiana Territory and Orleans Territory now cover several U.S. states, from the Gulf of Mexico to the border of Canada.

U.S. states once part of Louisiana territory include:

- Louisiana
- Arkansas
- Colorado
- Iowa
- Kansas
- Minnesota (part)
- Missouri
- Montana
- Nebraska
- North Dakota
- Oklahoma
- South Dakota
- Texas
- Wyoming
- New Mexico

Canadian provinces once part of Louisiana territory include:

- Alberta
- Saskatchewan

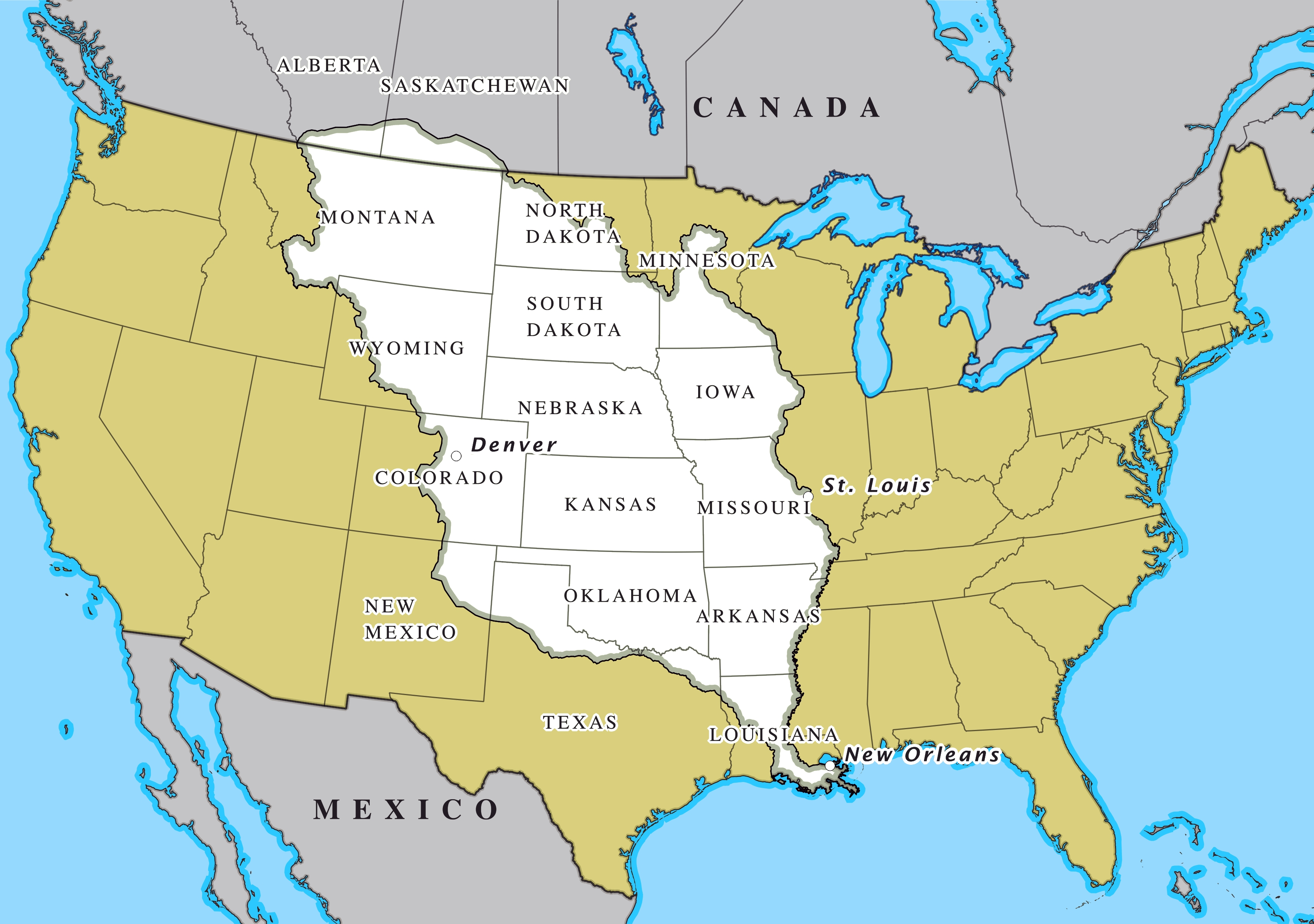

== See also ==
- Historic regions of the United States
- Territorial evolution of the United States
- Lewis and Clark Expedition
- Timeline of the Lewis and Clark Expedition
