= Zénon Trudeau =

6th Lieutenant Governor of Upper Louisiana
- In office 1792–1799
- Preceded by: Manuel Pérez
- Succeeded by: Carlos de Hault de Lassus

Personal details
- Born: November 28, 1748 New Orleans; Louisiana (New France)
- Died: September 12, 1813 (age 64) St. Charles Parish, Louisiana, United States
- Relatives: Charles Trudeau (brother)
- Profession: Administrator (commander governor) of Upper Louisiana; based in St. Louis

Zénon Trudeau (1748–1813) was a soldier, planter, and administrator who served as lieutenant governor of Upper Louisiana, New Spain, between 1792 and 1799. He was also a descendant of Étienne Truteau.

== Biography ==
Born in New Orleans, Trudeau joined the Spanish Army in his youth, a place where he excelled, attaining the rank of captain of the Regiment of Infantry and lieutenant colonel.

In 1792, Zénon Trudeau was appointed Lieutenant-governor of Upper Louisiana, a position located in St. Louis. During his administration two new posts were established. He commanded the galiot La Flèche in an expedition from Natchez to St. Louis and back in the winter of 1793.

In 1797, he granted lands which would later be part of the state of Missouri to Joseph Conway and his family, and to his friend Daniel Boone and his family (offering him 850 acres). Trudeau left his position as Lieutenant-governor of Alta Luisiana in 1799, being succeeded by Carlos de Hault de Lassus.

His son René Trudeau married Adèle Sauvé, daughter of Pierre Sauvé. Zénon Trudeau was the ancestor of Edward Trudeau, Garry Trudeau and Byron E. Thomas Jr..

== Sources ==
- Arthur, Stanley Clisby; Huchet de Kernion, George Campbell (2009) [1931]. Old Families of Louisiana. Clearfield.
