= Amos Stoddard =

United States Army officer and politician

Commandant of Louisiana
- In office March 10, 1804 – October 1, 1804
- Preceded by: Office established
- Succeeded by: William Henry Harrison (as Governor of the District of Louisiana)

Personal details
- Born: October 26, 1762 Woodbury, Connecticut, British America
- Died: May 11, 1813 (aged 50) Fort Meigs, Perrysburg, Ohio, U.S.

Military service
- Allegiance: United States
- Branch/service: United States Army
- Rank: Major
- Battles/wars: War of 1812

Amos Stoddard (October 26, 1762 – May 11, 1813) was a career United States Army officer who served in both the American Revolutionary War and the War of 1812, in which he was mortally wounded.

In 1804, Stoddard was the Commandant of the military district of Upper Louisiana, which later became Missouri after the Louisiana Purchase.

== Biography ==
Stoddard was born in Woodbury, Connecticut, to Anthony and Phebe (Reed) Stoddard. He saw combat as a young man in the American Revolutionary War, and afterwards represented Hallowell, Maine, in the Massachusetts House of Representatives. In June 1798, he was commissioned as a captain of artillery in the US Army.

Circa 1800 Stoddard commanded Fort Sumner in his home town of Portland, Maine as a company commander in the Regiment of Artillerists.

In 1800 Spain ceded Louisiana back to France in the Third Treaty of San Ildefonso. Three years later, Napoleon promptly sold it to the United States to obtain money to continue his campaigns in Europe. Nevertheless, Spain had continued to govern the territory and Carlos de Hault de Lassus, the Spanish lieutenant governor for Upper Louisiana, initially refused to give Lewis and Clark permission to explore it. This forced Lewis and Clark to spend the winter of 1803–04 at Camp Dubois, in what is now Illinois.

On November 30, 1803, in New Orleans, Spain formally turned the territory over to France, which governed it for only 20 days before surrendering it to the United States on December 20, 1803.

During the Three Flags Day ceremony on March 9–10, 1804, in Saint Louis, Stoddard represented both the United States and France. Lieutenant Governor de Lassus represented Spain. Stoddard noted about the residents:

Nothing ever restrains them from amusement which usually commences early in the evening, and is seldom suspended till late the next morning.

Stoddard held the position as a military commander until October 1, 1804, when the territory came under William Henry Harrison, in a transitional civil jurisdiction as part of the Indiana Territory. He was promoted to the rank of major in June 1807.

He was a member of Kennebec Lodge #5 A. F. and A. M in Hallowell, Maine, and delivered the oration at the first anniversary of the chartering of the lodge on St. John's Day 1797.

== Service at Fort Meigs ==
In the winter of 1812-13, after war had begun with Great Britain, Major Stoddard accompanied Governor Harrison to the Maumee rapids in Ohio, where they built Fort Meigs. Stoddard commanded the fort's artillery.

From May 1 to May 9 of 1813, Fort Meigs was attacked by a large British and Indian force from Canada under Major General Henry Procter (see Siege of Fort Meigs). Early on, Stoddard was wounded in the leg by shrapnel. He survived long enough to see the British retreat, but on May 11 he died from tetanus.

== Tributes ==
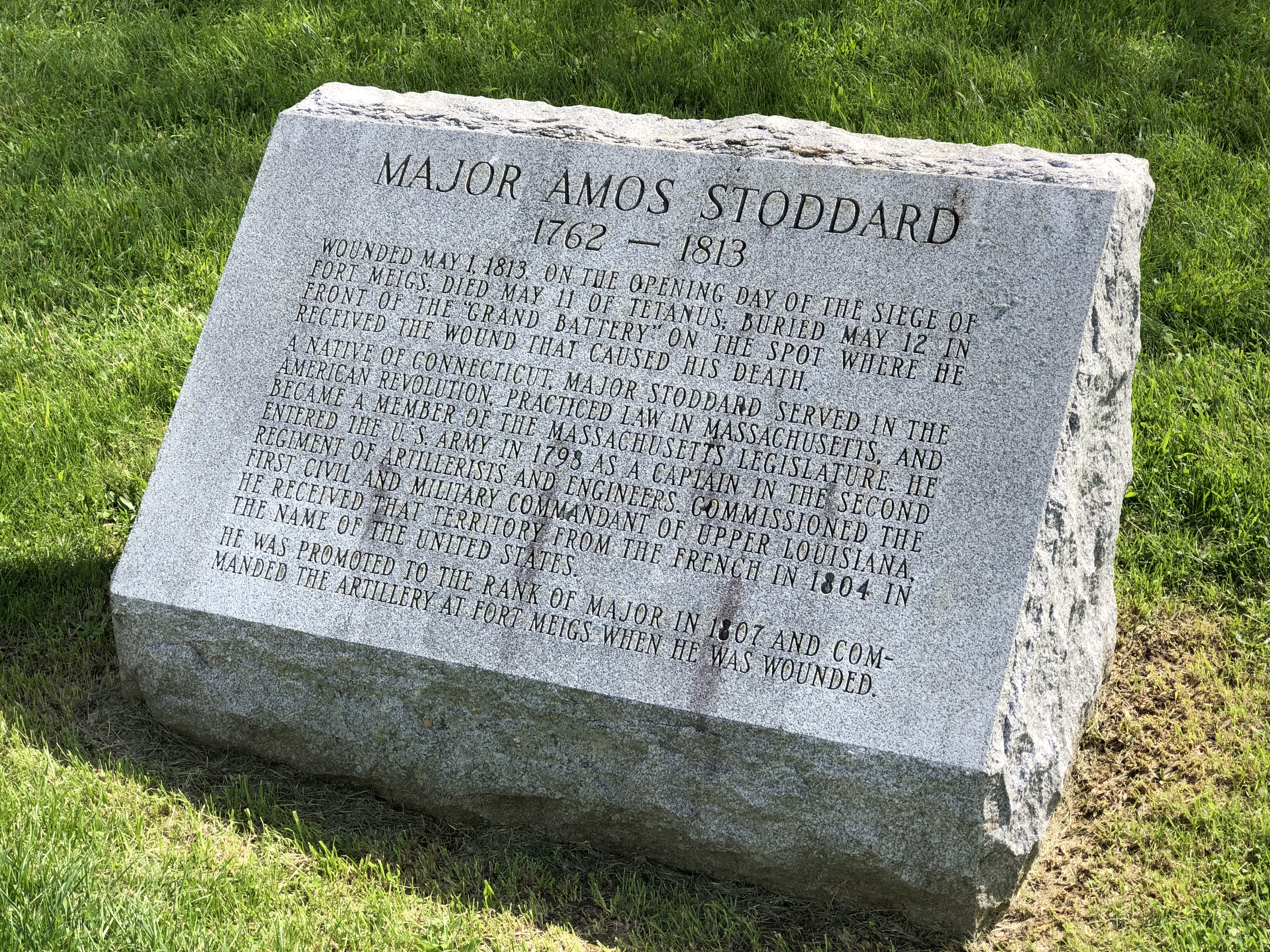
The stone monument to Amos Stoddard in Fort Meigs

According to a diary kept by Captain Daniel Cushing, Major Stoddard was buried in front of the Grand Battery at Fort Meigs. A stone monument inside the fort honors his memory today. Stoddard County, Missouri, was named for him.

Political offices
Preceded by none	Commandants of the Louisiana District; 1803-1804	Succeeded by William Henry Harrison (Indiana Territory)
