= Three Flags Day =

Day of transfer of Louisiana Territory from Spain to France, then to the US

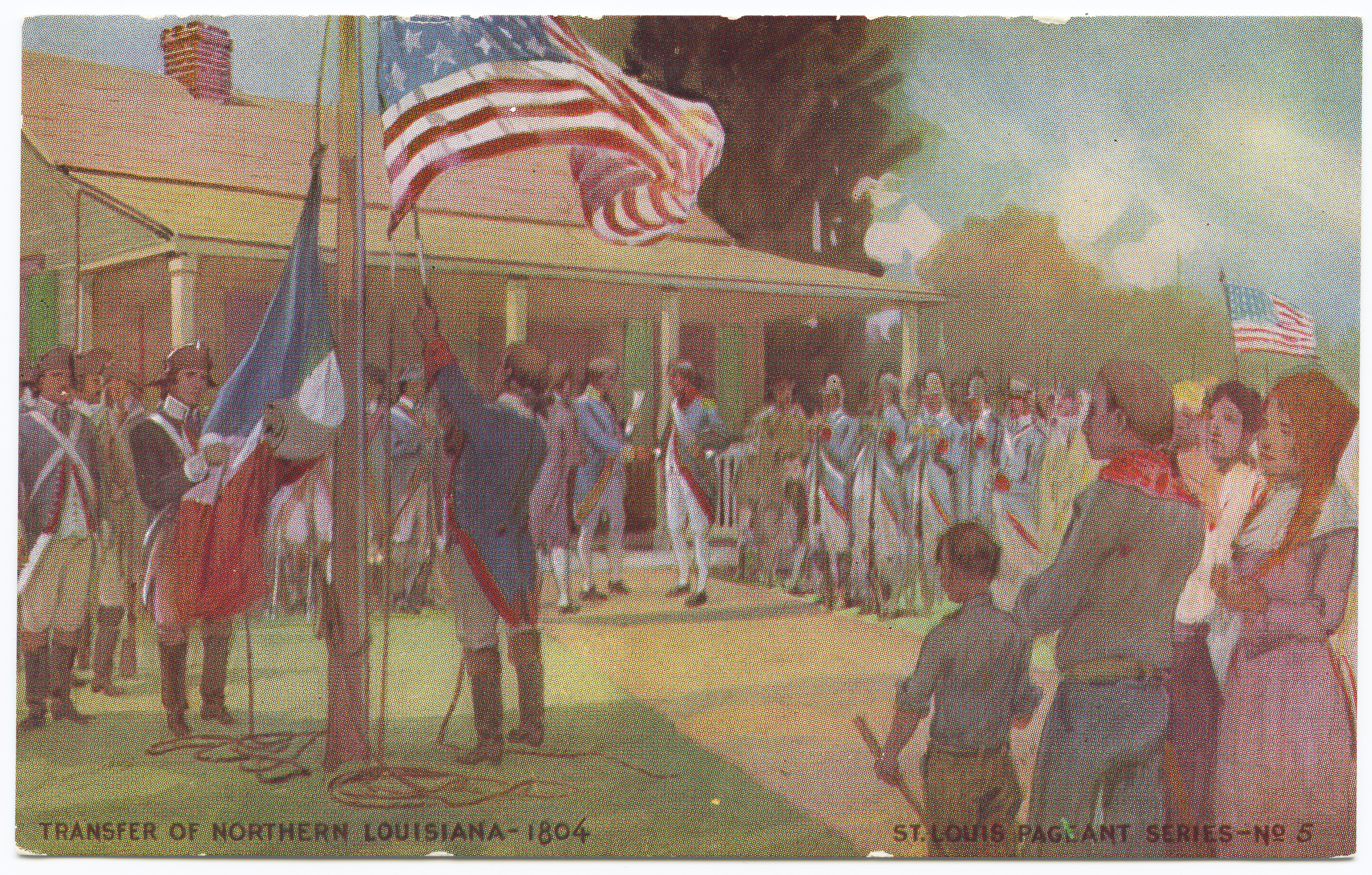
A postcard of a painting by F. L. Stoddard of the transfer of Upper Louisiana from France to the United States.

Three Flags Day commemorates March 9, and 10, 1804, when Spain officially completed turning over the Louisiana colonial territory to France, which then officially turned over the same lands to the United States, in order to finalize the 1803 Louisiana Purchase.

The ceremony in St. Louis cleared the way for Lewis and Clark to begin their exploration.

== Background ==
France had ruled Louisiana from its founding until the Treaty of Paris (1763), which ended the Seven Years' War (whose North American phase was the French and Indian War), in which treaty Spain received the French land west of the Mississippi River (the "right bank" going downstream) plus New Orleans, and Great Britain received the French lands east of the River (the "left bank") -- which included what had previously been called the Illinois Country or Upper Louisiana.

Spain officially took control of its territory in 1769, when it suppressed the Rebellion of 1768 by area residents who had resisted Spain's assumption of colonial authority in the formerly French domain. The United States extended its western boundaries to the Mississippi River during the American Revolutionary War, when General George Rogers Clark took possession of the lands east of the Mississippi River which had for some years belonged to Great Britain. American control of the territory which became today's Midwestern states (the former Illinois Country and Ohio Country) was not secure until both the Treaty of Paris (1783) and the Jay Treaty (1794) had been formalized.

On October 1, 1800, Napoleon Bonaparte concluded France's re-acquisition of La Louisiane (Spanish: Luisiana) from Spain, in the Third Treaty of San Ildefonso. However, the treaty was kept secret and Spain continued to administer the territory. The U.S. and France agreed on April 30, 1803, to the American purchase of Louisiana (which was announced publicly in the United States on July 4). However, the U.S. did not immediately take possession of these lands on the west side of the Mississippi, and Spain continued to administer the territory because it had not yet formally turned it over to France. After the United States' purchase, Thomas Jefferson announced plans for an exploration of the new territory. Spain, however, prohibited any foreign exploration of its territory. Lewis and Clark were to spend the winter of 1803–1804 at Camp Dubois in what was then the Indiana Territory, opposite the confluence of the Missouri and Mississippi Rivers. until the lands had been formally turned over to the United States.

== Ceremonies ==
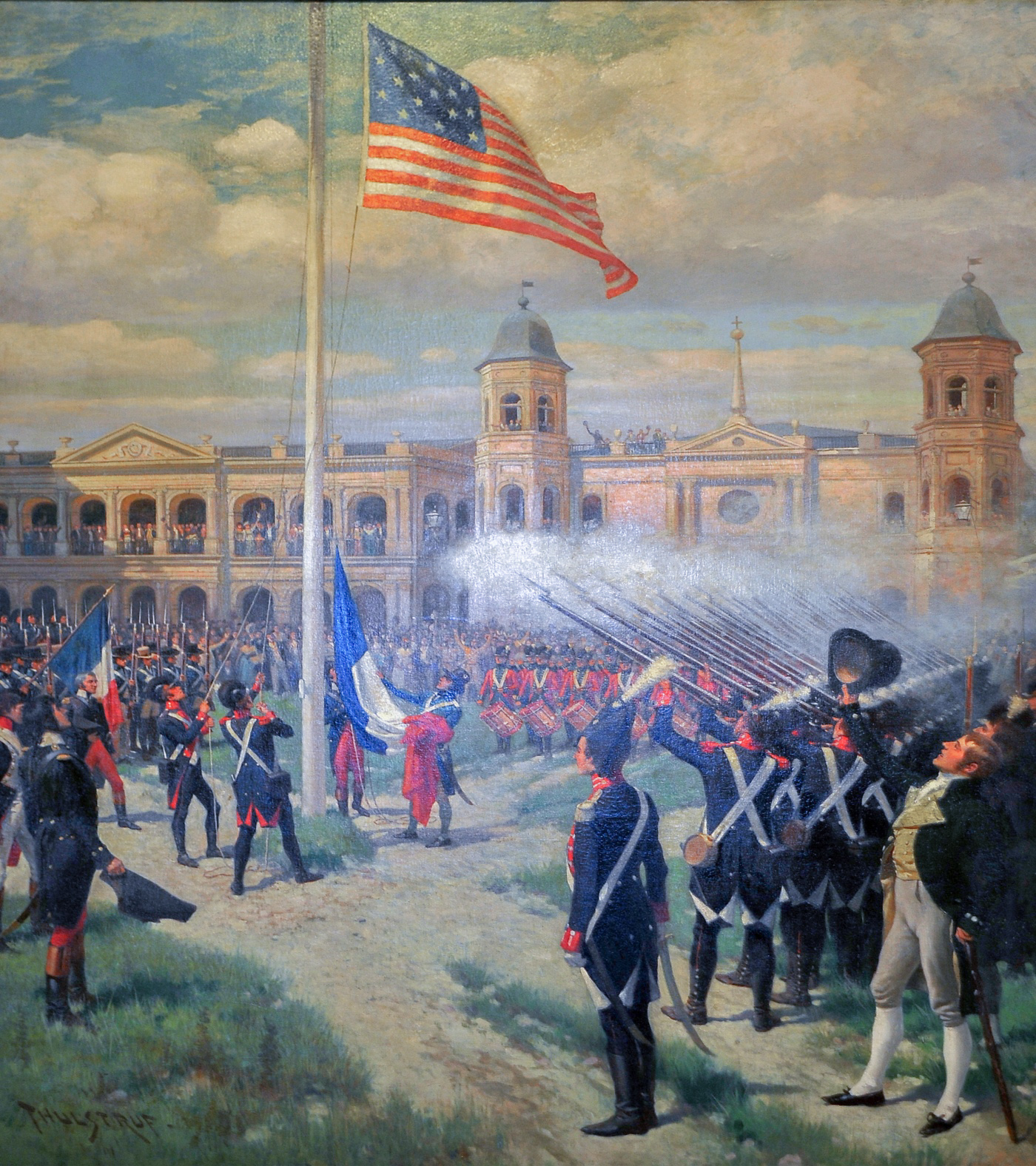
The handover ceremony at New Orleans on December 20, 1803

On November 30, 1803, Spain formally transferred the territory in a ceremony at the Cabildo and Plaza de Armas in New Orleans attended by Spanish Governors Juan Manuel de Salcedo and Sebastián Calvo de la Puerta y O'Farrill and new French Governor Pierre Clement de Laussat. On December 20, 1803, New Orleans and the rest of Louisiana were transferred to the United States in a ceremony with Laussat and incoming United States governor William C. C. Claiborne, with Gen. James Wilkinson in attendance. However, with navigation on the Mississippi halted because of winter, the news was not conveyed to St. Louis.

On March 9, 1804, Amos Stoddard, the new U.S. lieutenant governor for District of Louisiana, and Meriwether Lewis arrived in St. Louis by boat and were met by the Spanish lieutenant governor for Upper Louisiana, Carlos de Hault de Lassus. De Lassus said:

People of Upper Louisiana, by order of the king I am now about to surrender this post and its dependencies. The flag which has protected you during nearly 36 years will no longer be seen. The oath you took now ceases to bind. Your faithfulness and courage in upholding it will be remembered forever. From the bottom of my heart I wish you all prosperity.

The Spanish flag was lowered on March 9, and the French flag was hoisted to fly over the city of St. Louis for 24 hours. The French flag, initially supposed to have been lowered at sunset, remained under guard all night. The next morning, March 10, 1804, the American flag was hoisted. This event is sometimes referred to as the "Three Flag Ceremony" or the "Ceremony of Three Flags".
