= District of Louisiana =

Territory of the United States of America from 1804 to 1805

- Incorporated and unorganized territory of the United States
- 1804–1805
- Flag of the United States

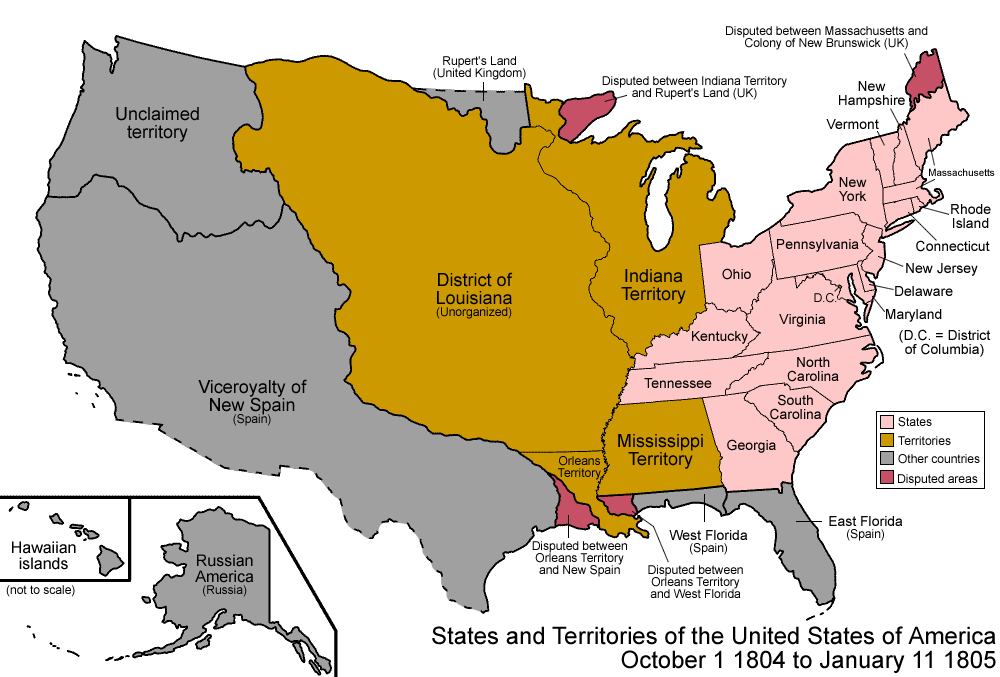
- A map of the District of Louisiana
- Capital: St. Louis
- Government
- Governor
  - 1804–1805: William Henry Harrison
- History
  - Established: 1 October 1804
  - Organized: 4 July 1805
Preceded by	Succeeded by
Louisiana Purchase	Louisiana Territory

The District of Louisiana, or Louisiana District, was an official and temporary United States government designation for the portion of the Louisiana Purchase that had not been organized into the Territory of Orleans or "Orleans Territory" (the portion of the Louisiana Purchase south of the 33rd parallel, which is now the Arkansas–Louisiana state line). The district officially existed from March 10, 1804, until July 4, 1805, when it was organized as the Louisiana Territory.

The area north of present-day Arkansas was commonly referred to as Upper Louisiana. The United States District of Louisiana had two incarnations: first, as a federally administered military district (March 10, 1804 - September 30, 1804); then as an organized territory (October 1, 1804 – July 4, 1805) under the jurisdiction of the Indiana Territory.

A similarly named "Louisiana District" had also previously been an administrative division under Spanish and French rule.

== Military district of Louisiana (1804) ==
In legislation enacted October 31, 1803, Congress made provisions for a temporary government of the territory purchased from France. The president was authorized to use military forces to maintain order, although the local civil government was to continue as it had under French and Spanish rule.

This military rule was in effect from March 10, 1804 —the official date of transfer from French hands (known as Three Flags Day) —until September 30, 1804. At this time, the district was further divided into five administrative divisions or districts: New Madrid, Cape Girardeau, Ste. Genevieve, St. Charles, and St. Louis.

Amos Stoddard served during this time as district commandant.

== Civilian district of Louisiana (1804–1805) ==
On March 26, 1804, Congress enacted legislation effective October 1, 1804, that extended the authority of the governor and judges of the Indiana Territory to provide temporary jurisdiction over the District of Louisiana.

Later that year, Indiana territorial governor William Henry Harrison and territorial judges Davis, Griffin, and Vandenberg held court in the district capital of St. Louis and enacted laws for the region.

On July 4, 1805, the District of Louisiana was re-designated as the Louisiana Territory (1805–1812), when it acquired its own territorial government, modeled on that of the Indiana Territory.

== Inhabitants' concerns ==
Under the terms of the act establishing the temporary government, the governor and judges of the Indiana Territory were to meet twice a year in St. Louis. However, the settlers west of the Mississippi River complained strongly about the arrangement. Opposition was indicated by:

- Protests of policies not recognizing the previous Spanish land grants (including property belonging to Daniel Boone);
- Objections to policies evicting settlers from land in anticipation of areas to be given to American Indians —who were to be relocated west of the Mississippi River;
- Disapproval over the implementation of common law when the land had been governed previously by civil law;
- Arguments over the introduction of new taxes;
- Dissatisfaction over the lack of provisions for schooling the French-speaking majority;
- Heated debate over fears that Northwest Ordinance provisions prohibiting slave ownership would be implemented in areas where slavery had historically been allowed;
- Concerns that the Indiana territorial capital, Vincennes, was more than 180 miles away from district capital, St. Louis.

Upset citizens of the Louisiana District met in St. Louis in September 1804 to sign a declaration formally protesting the annexation. Among the signers were Auguste Chouteau.

A notable event during this period was the signing of the Treaty of St. Louis, in which the Sauk and Meskwaki peoples ceded northeastern Missouri, northern Illinois and southern Wisconsin to the United States. Resentment over this treaty was to cause the tribes to side with the British during the War of 1812 in raids along the Missouri, Ohio, and Mississippi Rivers and was to spur the Black Hawk War in 1832.

On March 3, 1805, Congress enacted legislation organizing the District of Louisiana into the Louisiana Territory, effective July 4, 1805. The territorial government was organized similarly to that of the Indiana Territory.

== See also ==
- Historic regions of the United States
- History of Missouri
- Territorial evolution of the United States
  - Territories of Spain that encompassed land that would later become part of the District of Louisiana:
    - Santa Fé de Nuevo Méjico, 1598–1821
    - Tejas, 1690–1821
    - Luisiana, 1764–1803
  - Territory of France that encompassed land that would later become part of the District of Louisiana:
    - Louisiane, 1682–1764 and 1803
  - U.S. territory that would later become part of the District of Louisiana:
    - Louisiana Purchase, 1803–1804
  - U.S. territories that included territory that was previously part of the District of Louisiana:
    - Territory of Louisiana, 1805–1812
    - Territory of Missouri, 1812–1821
    - Territory of Arkansaw, 1819–1836
    - Indian Territory, 1834–1907
    - Territory of Iowa, 1838–1846
    - Territory of Minnesota, 1849–1858
    - Territory of New Mexico, 1850–1912
    - Territory of Kansas, 1854–1861
    - Territory of Nebraska, 1854–1867
    - Territory of Colorado, 1861–1876
    - Territory of Dakota, 1861–1889
    - Territory of Montana, 1864–1889
    - Territory of Wyoming, 1868–1890
    - Territory of Oklahoma, 1890–1907
  - U.S. states that include territory that was once part of the District of Louisiana:
    - State of Missouri, 1821
    - State of Arkansas, 1836
    - State of Texas, 1845
    - State of Iowa, 1846
    - State of Minnesota, 1858
    - State of Kansas, 1861
    - State of Nebraska, 1867
    - State of Colorado, 1876
    - State of North Dakota, 1889
    - State of South Dakota, 1889
    - State of Montana, 1889
    - State of Wyoming, 1890
    - State of Oklahoma, 1907
    - State of New Mexico, 1912
- Territorial evolution of Canada
  - Provinces of Canada that encompass land in the Missouri River drainage basin:
    - Saskatchewan, 1905
    - Alberta, 1905
