= Louisiana (New Spain) =

Province of New Spain

Province of Louisiana Provincia de Luisiana (Spanish)
- Province of New Spain
- 1762–1801
- Coat of arms

- Louisiana before the Treaty of Aranjuez
- Capital: Nueva Orleans
- Area
  - 1700s: 2,275,940 km^{2} (878,750 sq mi)
- Government
  - Type: Monarchy
- Historical era: Colonial; American Revolutionary War
  - Transfer by France: 23 November 1762
  - Returned to France: 21 March 1801
Preceded by	Succeeded by
Louisiana (New France)	Louisiana (New France)
- Today part of: Canada; United States

Louisiana (Spanish: Luisiana [lwiˈsjana]) was a province of New Spain from 1762 to 1801. It was primarily located in the center of North America encompassing the western basin of the Mississippi River plus New Orleans. The area had originally been claimed and controlled by France, which had named it La Louisiane in honor of King Louis XIV in 1682. Spain secretly acquired the territory from France near the end of the Seven Years' War by the terms of the Treaty of Fontainebleau (1762). The actual transfer of authority of the city of New Orleans was gradual. When Spain finally attempted to fully replace the city's French authorities in 1767, French residents staged an uprising, which the new Spanish colonial governor did not suppress until 1769. Spain also took possession of the trading post of St. Louis and all of Upper Louisiana in the late 1760s, though there was little Spanish presence in the wide expanses of what they called the "Illinois Country".

New Orleans was the main port of entry for Spanish supplies sent to American forces during the American Revolution, and Spain and the new United States disputed the borders of Louisiana and navigation rights on the Mississippi River for the duration of Spain's rule in the colony. New Orleans was devastated by large fires in 1788 and 1794 which destroyed most of the original wooden buildings in what is today the French Quarter. New construction was done in the Spanish style with stone walls and slate roofs, and new public buildings constructed during the city's Spanish period include several still standing today such as the St. Louis Cathedral, the Cabildo, and the Presbytere.

Louisiana was later and briefly retroceded back to France under the terms of the Third Treaty of San Ildefonso (1800) and the Treaty of Aranjuez (1801). In 1802, King Charles IV of Spain published a royal bill on 14 October, effecting the transfer and outlining the conditions. Spain agreed to continue administering the colony until French officials arrived and formalized the transfer. After several delays, the official transfer of ownership took place at the Cabildo in New Orleans on 30 November 1803. Three weeks later on 20 December, another ceremony was held at the same location in which France transferred New Orleans and the surrounding area to the United States pursuant to the Louisiana Purchase. A transfer ceremony of Upper Louisiana to France and then to the United States took place on Three Flags Day in St. Louis. It encompassed a series of ceremonies held over two days: 9–10 March 1804.

== History ==
=== Spanish exploration ===
The Spanish were the first known Europeans to discover the Mississippi Delta during the expedition of Alonso Álvarez de Pineda in 1519. The Narváez expedition left Cuba in 1528 and met several disasters as it sailed along the Gulf Coast between Florida and Texas (Galveston Island), ending in the fall of 1528 with only four survivors: Álvar Núñez Cabeza de Vaca, an enslaved Moor named Estevanico, and two other Spaniards. During the next eight years, Cabeza de Vaca traveled across what is now the U.S. southwest, including the coast of Louisiana (his book Naufragios y comentarios recounts this adventure). He reconnected with Spanish civilization in Mexico City in 1536.

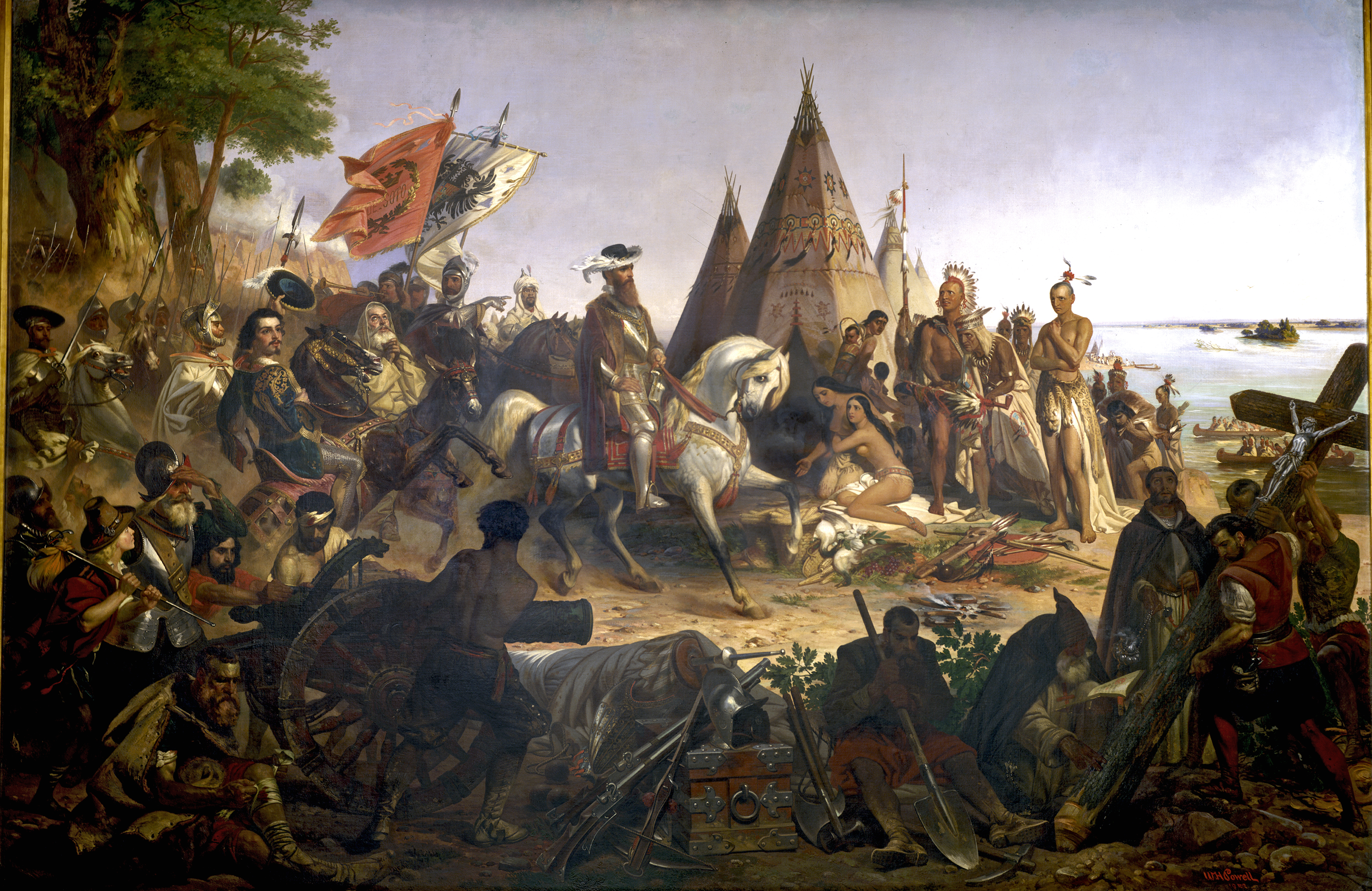
De Soto claiming the Mississippi, as depicted in the United States Capitol rotunda.

Long before France began exploring this area and creating the colony of New France, the Spanish had already explored the Mississippi River (which they called "Río del Espíritu Santo") and its vast basin from La Florida. Hernando de Soto claimed the Mississippi Basin for Spain in 1538. Spanish Captain Luis de Moscoso de Alvarado reached the territory of the Natchitoches (also called Nachistochis by the Spanish) in 1542 and then went on to Texas. Shortly before, Francisco Vázquez de Coronado's expedition left Mexico in search of the Seven Golden Cities and the Great Quivira (1540-1542). In October 1541, he crossed the plateau he called Llano Estacado, explored the vast prairies (Great Plains) of the territory he named "Cíbola" or "Llanos de Cíbola" (due to the abundance of cíbolos or American bison) or "Llanos del Cubo", perhaps a distortion of the original Spanish name. He reached, from the north, approximately Uachita in today's Ouachita County (Arkansas) and, from the east, to Kansas. In 1601, from the already Hispanic Texas (or Tejas) and New Mexico, Juan de Oñate and his Spanish troops entered the Great Plains area, almost reaching the city of natives whom the Spanish nicknamed Rayados due to the stripe tattoos from their eyes to their ears that these natives (the Wichita) wore. Oñate's forces nearly reached the city of Etnazoa, which perhaps had a huge population of 20,000 inhabitants in today's Arkansas City. However, the few troops led by Oñate had to retreat due to indigenous hostility and not finding any trace of gold or other typical riches of mercantile capitalism.

=== French exploration ===
Starting in 1673, the French, originating from their colonies in New France (present-day Quebec and Acadia, Canada), began to explore the Mississippi River and claimed the territory for France.

The first French settlers explored the new territories of the Mississippi Basin from the Great Lakes (which they reached via the St. Lawrence River). They undertook canoe journeys that lasted about five to six weeks, aided by the downstream currents of the Mississippi River. In this manner, they traveled from Montreal to Fort Michilimackinac and Grand Portage, a route which included about 50 smaller portages or carryovers. They could also access the territory via the Ohio River (Ujayu), a more accessible and easy route to travel from Montreal to New Orleans during the time of New France. River navigation was relatively swift when going downstream (it took approximately 15 days to travel from the Ohio Basin to New Orleans) but going upstream, or against the current, from New Orleans, took almost three months. The navigation technique of the time only allowed for a speed of about 3 miles per hour (4.8 km/h). Upstream navigation improved only with the advent of steamboats in the second half of the 19th century, known as steamers. The three existing routes from New Orleans to Upper Louisiana were challenging and full of hazards. This might explain, in part, why the French were able to maintain the territory's integrity for over 80 years and the Spanish for 40 years.

=== French colonization ===
In 1682, the region was named French Louisiana (la Louisiane Française) in honor of Louis XIV, King of France, and was incorporated into New France as an administrative district. It stretched from the Upper Mississippi watershed to the Gulf of Mexico and was first settled from the North.

In 1718, New Orleans was founded, which would become the most important city in the territory and its capital in 1723.

Spain entered the Seven Years' War in support of France, near its conclusion. King Charles III asked the French king to hand over Louisiana to Spain in exchange for Spain's support, which was accepted in the Treaty of Fontainebleau of 1762. However, the war turned out unfavorable for Spain, and Great Britain seized the Floridas. At the end of the war, the Treaty of Paris of 1763 was signed, acknowledging that Great Britain received the Floridas from Spain. To balance Spain's loss of the Floridas, it gained most of what had been French Louisiana (Upper French Louisiana was split with Britain at the Mississippi River, with the west going to Spain).

In the same Treaty of Paris of 1763, France handed over New France (Quebec and Acadia, today Canada) and the eastern Illinois Country to Great Britain. Until then, the fortress known as Fort de Chartres had served as the center of French administration in the region.

The British were slow in establishing regiments in their part of the newly acquired Illinois Country (Pays des Illinois). However, on October 10, 1765, a small detachment of the 42nd Royal Highland Regiment under the command of Captain Thomas Stirling took control of the Fort Chartres fortress and its surroundings. French settlers were ordered to leave or obtain a special license to stay. Many French settlers moved across the river to St. Louis (Missouri), then under Spanish rule. One of the three founding partners was Gilbert Antoine de St. Maxent, who would become the father-in-law of the governors of Louisiana, Luis de Unzaga y Amézaga and later also Bernardo de Gálvez.

== Geography ==
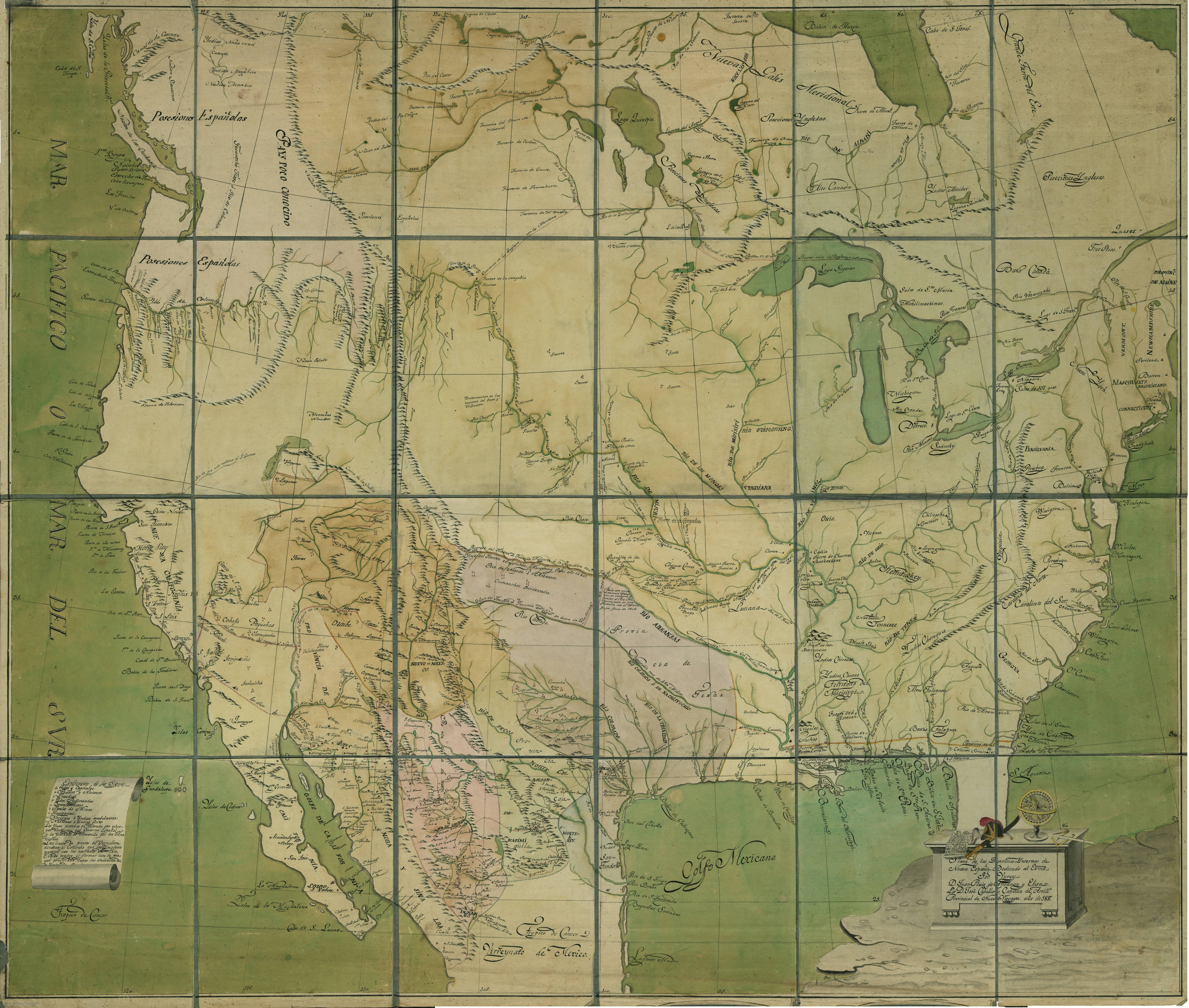
Spanish map from 1817 of the Internal Provinces of New Spain, which, in addition to these provinces, includes the entire territory that was part of Spanish Louisiana (or Luciana).

Spanish Louisiana stretched from the Gulf of Mexico's Coastal Plain and the areas adjacent to the Mississippi Delta to Canada's border. From east to west, it covered the left basin of the Mississippi up to the Rocky Mountains in northeastern Colorado and the Mountain region, thus covering a large part of the Midwest. It spanned an area of 878,745 square miles (2,275,940 km^{2}), including all or parts of more than ten current U.S. states.

The population of this vast Spanish territory was estimated to be 125,000 people in 1785. This population was concentrated along the main – and to a lesser extent, secondary – rivers and watercourses such as the Mississippi River, the Red River, and the Missouri River. Demographic movements developed along these rivers and the Ohio River, which, located in the Illinois Country, had already been subjected to Britain after the British Empire defeated the French Empire in the 18th century. By the time Spain received Louisiana, indigenous Sioux (called Siuxes by the Spanish) or Cheyennes populations were estimated to be about 30,000 in Upper Louisiana, primarily in Minnesota.

Ecologically, the vast territory of Spanish Louisiana corresponded to most of what is now called the Midwest and included the following biomes: The Great Plains, largely consisting of expansive flat and gently rolling prairies roamed by herds of millions of massive American bison or cíbolos. These prairies or great plains, covered with tall grasslands (up to 6 feet high) with deep and extensive roots, were located west of the western forests and north of the Cross Timbers, a wooded region primarily composed of deciduous trees. It continued about 150 miles (240 km) west of the Mississippi River from the dense mixed temperate forests that populated the eastern area of North America from the North Atlantic Ocean until the 19th century. These forests were cleared by American settlers after 1803; many forests in Lower Louisiana and The Floridas not only grew in flooded areas but also had foliage covered with Spanish moss, forming natural serpentine hanging from the branches down to the watery ground. In the far west and north, the great prairies entered an ecotone often covered by coniferous forests, especially in the west where the mountainous relief began.

Except for areas near the Gulf of Mexico which have a subtropical climate, most of the territory (The Great Plains) has a continental climate with warm summers and very cold winters. These plains allow the alternation of warm fronts from the south and icy fronts from the north, causing Spanish Louisiana's core to experience frequent tornadoes and lighting storms, especially in Oklahoma. As for the areas adjacent to the gulf, they occasionally suffer from hurricanes from the southwest that reach important southern cities like New Orleans.

== Spanish government ==
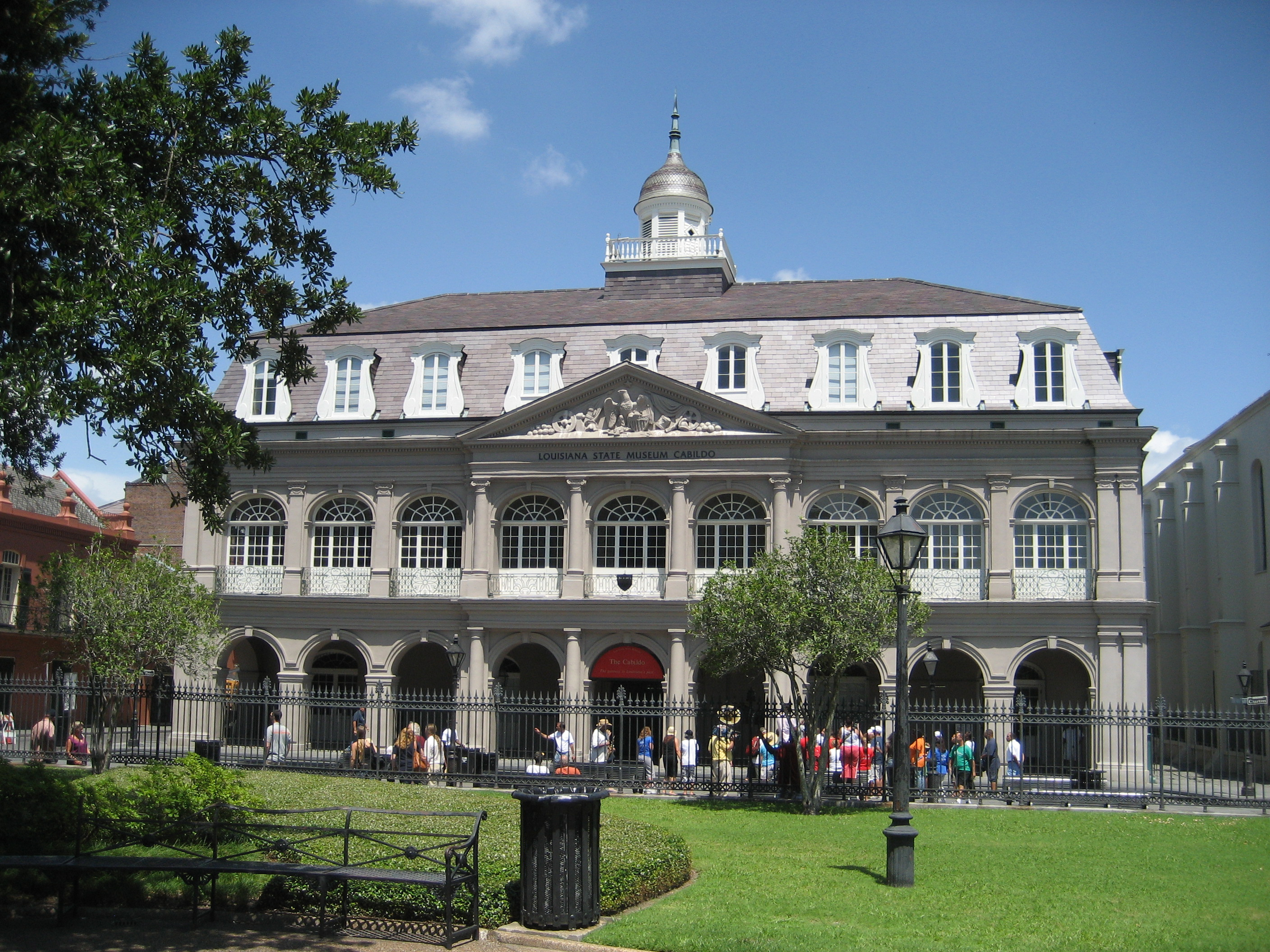
The Cabildo in New Orleans, originally called "Casa Capitular", served as the headquarters for the Spanish governor when Louisiana was under Spanish rule. The building today showcases a mix of designs: the preserved Spanish colonial features like the two-story layout with wraparound balconies and rounded arches, was later added in 1847 a revival French-inspired mansard roofs. Capping it all off is a dome-like turret that gives a nod to its Spanish roots.

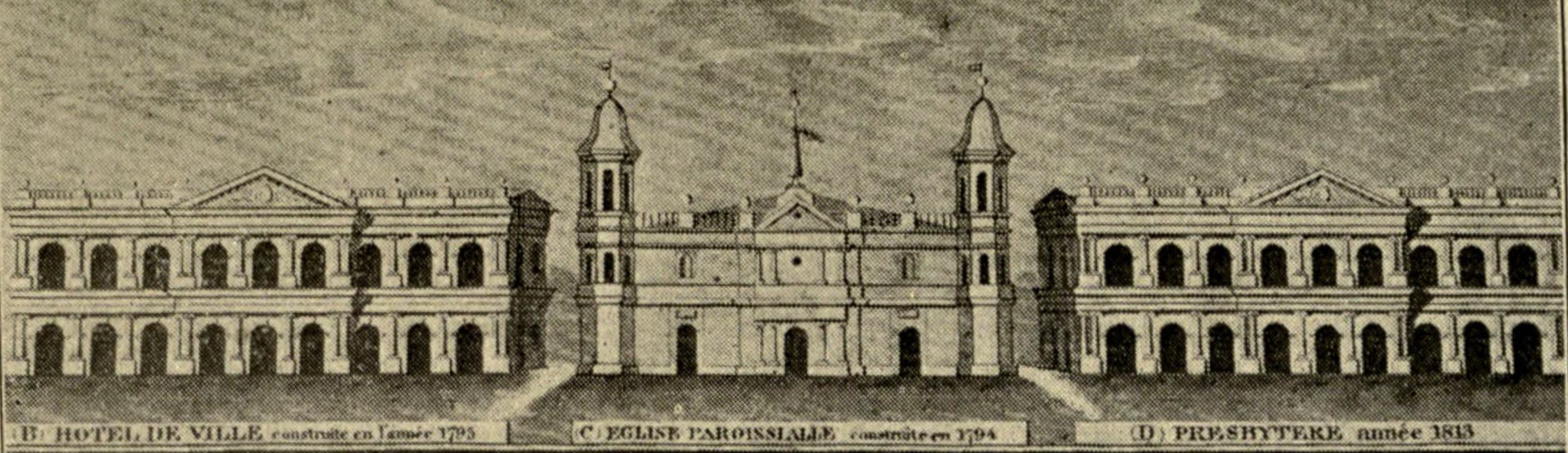
An 1815 engraving of the Plaza de Armas of New Orleans. From left are the Cabildo, St. Louis Cathedral, and the Presbytère.

In 1764, Spain formally announced its acquisition of Louisiana. Antonio de Ulloa assumed his role as Louisiana's first Spanish governor in 1766. However, by 1768, a rebellion erupted, largely fueled by the settlers' displeasure with the governor. Alejandro O'Reilly, the second governor, successfully suppressed the uprising. Soon after, under the leadership of Governor Luis de Unzaga y Amézaga, who also presided over the New Orleans Cabildo, Spanish law was instituted. Notably, the cabildo banned the enslavement of indigenous people. And on November 3, 1770, Governor Luis de Unzaga y Amézaga abolished ineffective regulations on slave acquisition with his legal code.

Louisiana, under Spanish rule, especially during the terms of Malagan governors Luis de Unzaga y Amézaga and his brother-in-law, Bernardo de Gálvez, experienced significant demographic shifts. Spanish authorities promoted considerable European migration (including Acadians, Islanders, Alsatians, and Americans), resulting in a 500% population growth in Spanish Louisiana from 1763 to 1803. This brought the number of European-descended inhabitants to 50,000. However, Spain's trade monopoly hindered the economy of these immigrants.

To solidify control over Spanish borders in Upper Louisiana, especially along the Missouri basin, a Spanish military expedition led by Captain Francisco Rui set out from New Orleans in 1767. Rui established multiple Spanish forts in Upper Louisiana. Meanwhile, French settlers, who resided in the region east of the Mississippi River before English occupation, favored Spanish sovereignty. This led them to relocate to the river's western side. Hence, Kaskaskia was occupied by the English, while French settlers, protected by Spain, settled in Santa Genoveva del Mississippi and San Luis de Illinois. The English and later the Americans utilized the ancient Cahokia mound to establish a fort opposite the Spanish capital of Upper Louisiana.

Notable figures of the Spanish period included Malagan governors Luis de Unzaga y Amézaga and his successor and future brother-in-law, Bernardo de Gálvez. Governor Luis de Unzaga y Amézaga transformed the expansive, nearly uninhabited, and undefended province into a thriving region with some autonomy. Known as 'le Conciliateur', he adopted a conciliatory approach, notably freeing the leaders of the Louisiana Revolution and promoting cross-border trade with American settlers through the Mississippi. This boosted the economies of New Orleans and St. Louis. In addition, Unzaga y Amézaga established the world's first bilingual and intercultural public education system on December 19, 1771. He strengthened Louisiana's defenses, planning the creation of forts such as the Unzaga Post. From April 1776, he covertly aided American revolutionaries during the American Revolution by supplying powder, medicine, flour, etc., responding to requests from Patrick Henry, Charles Lee, Robert Morris, and other members of the Continental Army's Secret Committee.

In contrast, Bernardo de Gálvez, succeeding Unzaga y Amézaga as interim governor, declared war on Great Britain on May 8, 1779. He defeated the British in Baton Rouge, Naches, Mobile, and Pensacola, reclaiming Florida for Spain in 1781, a feat recognized by the 1783 Treaty of Paris. An iconic statue of him stands on Canal Street, and the Texan city of Galveston is named in his honor.

Governor Esteban Rodríguez Miró's tenure witnessed two major fires that ravaged half of New Orleans. To regulate building constructions, he introduced Spanish architectural styles, resulting in arcades, courtyards, and fountains, traces of which remain evident today.

Colonel Juan Bautista Gemmir y Lleonart briefly succeeded Rodríguez Miró until the arrival of the new governor, Baron de Carondelet, in 1791. The Baron began his rule in 1791 and distinguished himself as one of the city's top administrators and urban planners. He commissioned the construction of new trade canals and built forts to shield the city from military attacks. Other advancements during his tenure included public lighting, night patrols, and the release of Louisiana's first newspaper.

Manuel Luis Gayoso de Lemos, who served from 1797 to 1799, is the only Spanish governor buried in New Orleans.

Following the French Revolution, Napoleon Bonaparte sought to reclaim Louisiana. The governor who followed Gayoso was the Marquess of Casa Calvo (1799–1801), and the last Spanish governor was Juan Manuel Salcedo (1801-1803). Ultimately, the 1800 Treaty of San Ildefonso saw Louisiana returned to France under Napoleon's pressure.

== Upper and Lower, or the Louisianas ==
In 1772, Spanish Governor Luis de Unzaga y Amézaga instituted a territorial subdivision of Louisiana into Upper Louisiana (Luisiana Superior) and Lower Louisiana (Luisiana Inferior). The dividing line was approximately set at latitude 36°35'N, which is roughly in alignment with New Madrid. This northern demarcation was farther up than what the French had previously considered. To the French, Lower Louisiana was the region south of approximately latitude 31°N (which aligns with the current boundary of the state of Louisiana) or the area south of where the Arkansas River meets the Mississippi River, around 33°46'N latitude.

In 1764, French fur trading interests founded St. Louis (San Luis de Illinois) in what was then known as the Illinois Country. The Spanish referred to St. Louis as "the city of Illinois" and governed the region from St. Louis as the "District of Illinois".

== Demographics of Spanish Louisiana ==
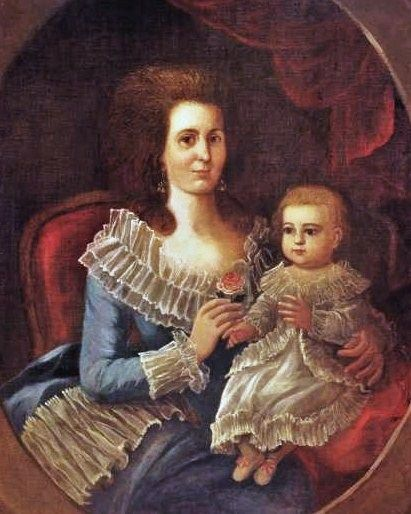
Señora de Balderes and her baby, family native of Nueva Orleans, Spanish colonial Louisiana, by José Francisco de Salazar (painter born in Mérida, Mexico), ca. 1790. The family lived on Calle Real street in what is now called the "French Quarter". Louisiana State Museum

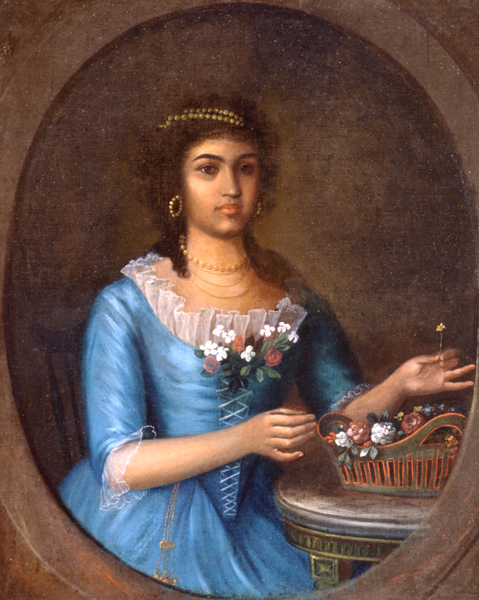
Portrait of Marianne Celeste Dragon, c. 1795, a wealthy land-owning woman of mixed race who later married a white man in Spanish colonial Louisiana, painted by José Francisco de Salazar.

Bernardo de Gálvez assumed the roles of Mayor of New Orleans and interim Governor of Spanish Louisiana on January 1, 1777. France had ceded Louisiana to Spain in 1763 as compensation for handing Florida over to England after the Seven Years' War. Gálvez's primary mission was to monitor events in the British colonies in North America, which were embroiled in war, and prepare the territory for a potential conflict with the United Kingdom. At that time, the region was sparsely populated, with both free inhabitants and slaves, as well as indigenous people. During the early decades of Spanish rule, however, the population grew rapidly: according to a census conducted during O'Reilly's governance in 1769, there were 13,513 inhabitants (excluding indigenous people). Two decades later, the population had surged to 31,433. However, by the end of the century, this growth had plateaued. Notably, the percentage of the Spanish population remained quite low, only reaching about 15% by the end of the Spanish period.

Although the non-indigenous free population represented considerably less than half of the province's total, they wielded significant power. Gálvez's economic policies facilitated the continued dominance of the regional oligarchy, which was primarily composed of Creoles or "creoles". Additionally, the colony had a small but significant free Black population. Government policies on slavery—a status that the majority of the non-indigenous population fell into—largely sought to sustain it. Still, they enabled an increase in slaves who had purchased their freedom. Aiming to boost agriculture and curry favor with the Creole oligarchy, Gálvez authorized the increased importation of African slaves in November 1777.

To reinforce the defensive function of this border territory, there was a drive to increase the population, partly through immigration from both Spanish nationals and foreigners, preferably Catholics. In previous decades, settlers of German and French cultures, specifically the Acadians, had settled in the region and had played a part in the revolt against Governor Ulloa. Among the Spanish immigrants, Gálvez particularly encouraged Andalusians to settle, though the majority came from the Canary Islands and were thus termed "Isleños".

Governors, especially Bernardo de Gálvez, focused on curbing English smuggling and promoting monopolistic trade between the large colony and the Spanish metropolis, and occasionally with France.

=== Immigration from Saint-Domingue ===
Beginning in the 1790s, following the slave rebellion in Saint-Domingue (now Haiti) that began in 1791, waves of refugees came to Louisiana. Over the next decade, thousands of migrants from the island landed there, including ethnic Europeans, free people of color, and African slaves, some of the latter brought in by the white elites. They greatly increased the French-speaking population in New Orleans and Louisiana, as well as the number of Africans, and the slaves reinforced African culture in the city.

== Economy ==
One of the reasons the Spanish Monarchy, which during its height largely adhered to mercantilism, did not prioritize such vast and fertile territories (especially in agriculture and livestock) was the lack of significant gold, silver, or precious stone mines. Additionally, the absence of non-enslaved labor to advance intensive agriculture, which became prolific from the latter half of the 19th century, played a role. Although significant gold and silver deposits were eventually discovered in the mountains of present-day Colorado, this discovery came late—just around the time the territory was handed over to the United States.

The core of Louisiana's economy was primarily based on almost industrial-scale hunting, especially of the bison (also known as "cíbolos") and other wildlife. This practice was later intensified by the Americans, leading to the near-extinction of some species. Consequently, one of the main export items became hides and leather, fostering growth in the fur and leatherworking sectors, and perhaps even in fine leather goods production in the major towns. Bison meat was exported as a preserved item, often resembling the "pemmican" style of jerky during that era.

By the end of Spanish rule, significant portions of Lower Louisiana started cultivating cotton, which would become a globally essential textile until the mid-20th century.

== Borders ==
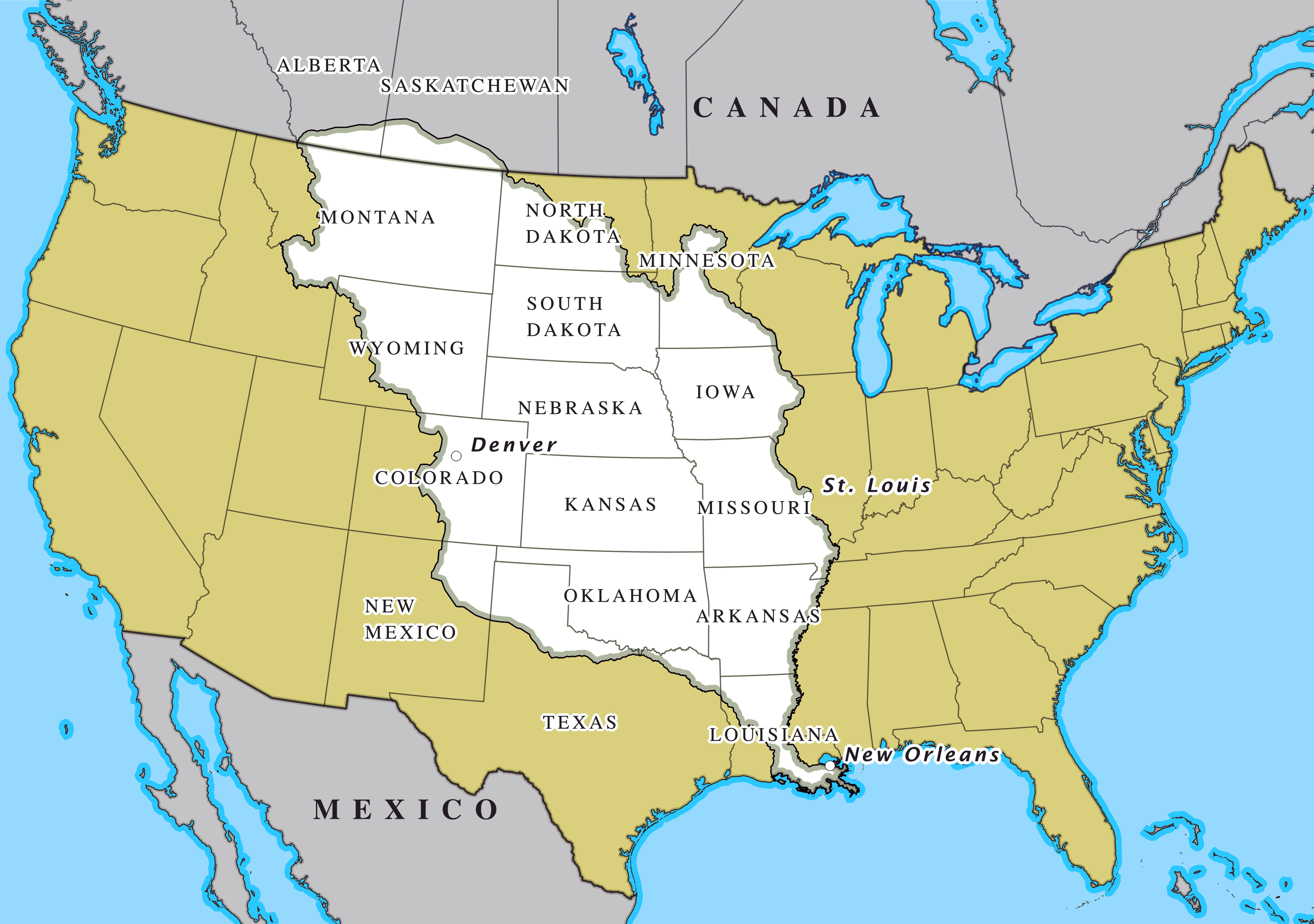
Areas of Spanish Louisiana around 1803 overlaid over the current American states that it encompassed.

The territory of Spanish Louisiana encompassed the entire Mississippi Basin to the west, starting from the right bank of the Mississippi River and including the entire Mississippi Delta, which also encompassed New Orleans. In the absence of sufficiently-known geographical landmarks at the time, aside from parts of the Mississippi River's watershed, the French initially laid claim to territories that were indisputably Spanish up to the Rio Grande. That encompassed all of Spanish Texas or Tejas and the western half of New Mexico. When the Louisiana Purchase occurred, the Americans inherited these French claims, leading to immediate disputes in Spain.

The territorial boundaries had not been defined in the Treaty of Fontainebleau through which France ceded it to Spain. The same was true in the Treaty of San Ildefonso, which involved retrocession to France, and in the final purchase agreement. The United States claimed that Louisiana included the entire western part of the Mississippi Basin up to the Rocky Mountains watershed and the southeastern land up to the Rio Grande. Spain argued that it comprised only the Mississippi Basin's western half and New Orleans.

Specifically, Americans laid claim to territories that had been Spanish for centuries, resulting in conflicts with the Spaniards in all frontier areas. A partial acknowledgment of these American claims occurred with the Adams-Onís Treaty. Through the treaty, the Americans staked their claims on the southwestern area of today's state of Louisiana, including regions like Natchitoches and Lake Charles, in exchange for recognizing the boundaries at the Red River and Nexpentle/Arkansas up to the 42°N parallel and the main meridians connecting these points. However, despite the treaty, jingoists claimed areas like Texas, much of New Mexico and Colorado, and more, as part of what they termed Lower Louisiana. This was although the true Lower Louisiana referred to the southern part of the Mississippi Basin from New Madrid's latitude.

Manuel Salcedo handed over Lower Louisiana at the New Orleans Cabildo, while Upper Louisiana was officially ceded in St. Louis by Lieutenant Governor Carlos de Hault de Lassus.

== Timeline ==
Historical affiliations

French Empire 1718–1763
Spanish Empire 1763–1802
French Republic 1802–1803
United States of America 1803–1861
Confederate States of America 1861–1865
United States of America 1862–present

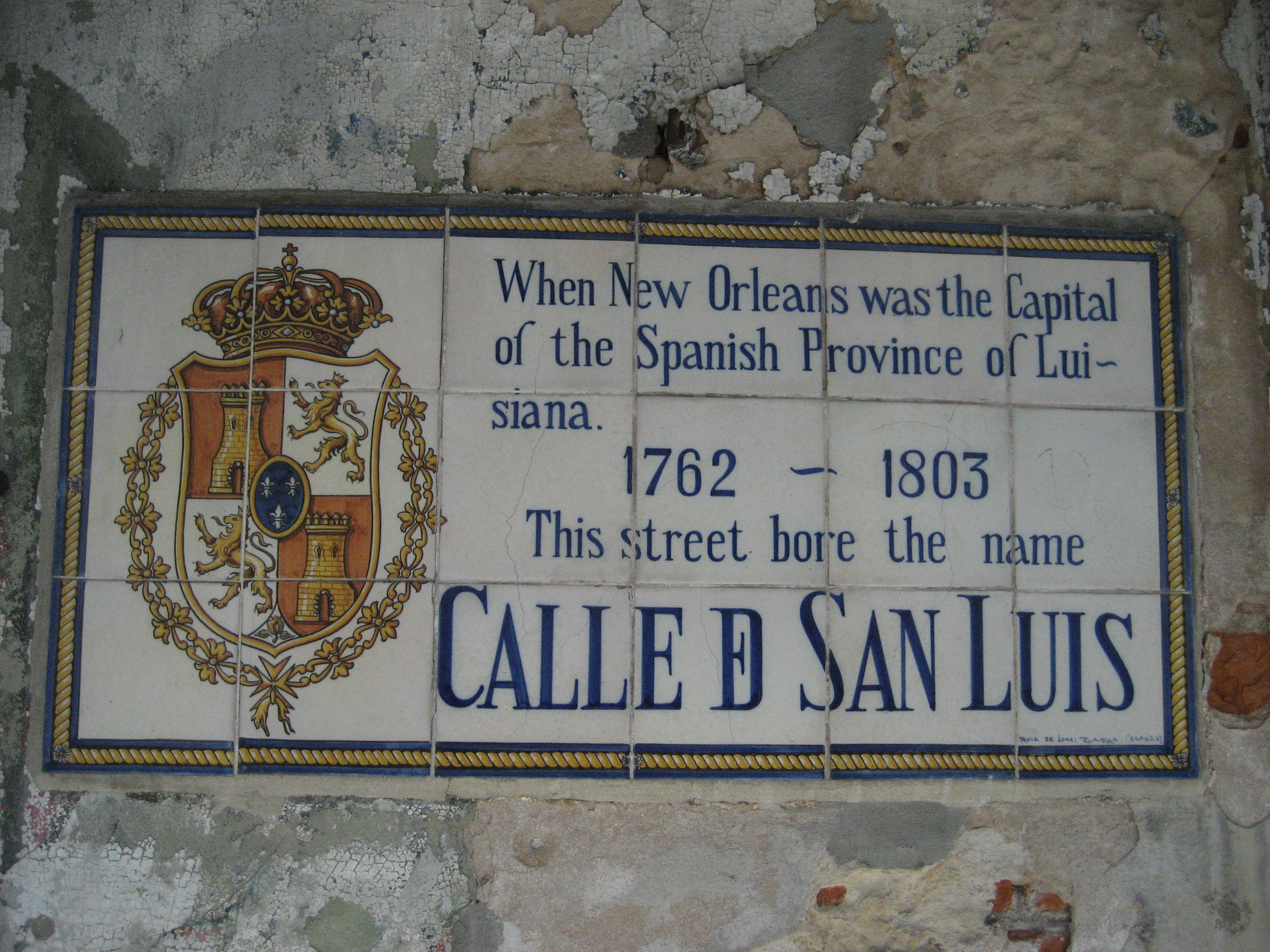
Calle de San Luis in the French Quarter of New Orleans

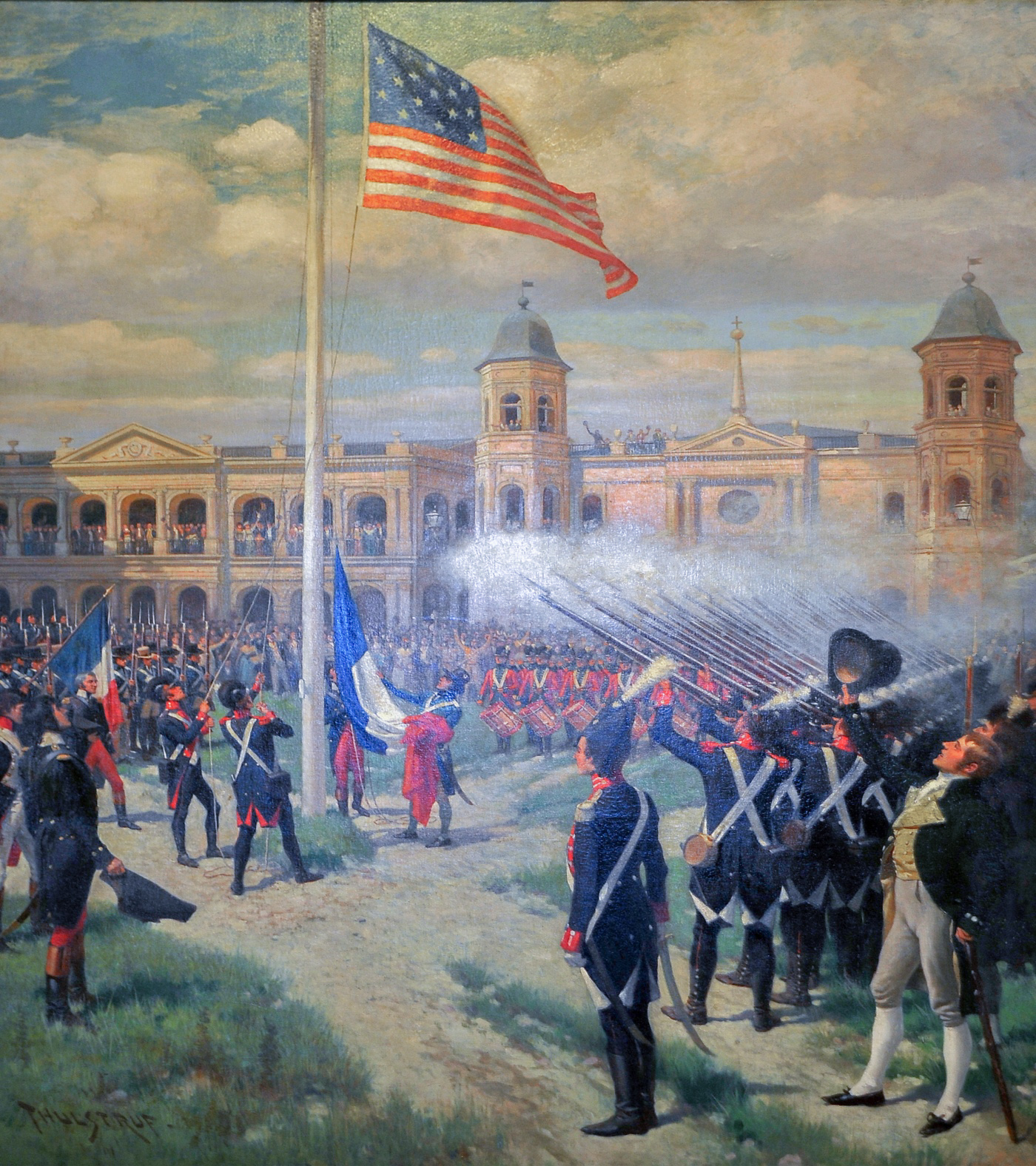
The French flag is removed and the American flag is hoisted in New Orleans after the Louisiana Purchase. In the background is the Cathedral of New Orleans, built in 1794 during Spanish rule. To the left is the Spanish Cabildo. Louisiana State Museum.

Spanish exploration

- 1519: Alonso Álvarez de Pineda discovered the Mississippi delta.
- 1528: Álvar Núñez Cabeza de Vaca traversed the area near the northern coast of the Gulf of Mexico, covering territories corresponding to present-day Louisiana.
- 1541: Hernando de Soto explored from Florida, claimed the Mississippi River and all its tributaries for the Spanish Crown.
- 1541: Francisco Vázquez de Coronado explored from Mexico to Quivira, reaching the current city named Lindsborg in Kansas.
- 1601: Juan de Oñate entered from the southwest from Texas and New Mexico to the center of Kansas and west of Arkansas.

Louisiana (New France)

- 1673: Jacques Marquette and Louis Jolliet began exploring the Mississippi River from present-day Canada, marking the start of French influence and claims over the territory.
- 1699: Jean-Baptiste Le Moyne de Bienville started the first French settlement at Fort Maurepas (now Ocean Springs, Mississippi).
- 1702: Bienville moved French settlements to Dauphin Island and established the Mabile colony with Fort Louis.
- 1714: Natchitoches was founded, named after the indigenous Natchitoches tribe.
- 1718: Bienville started constructing New Orleans, shifting the capital of French Louisiana.
- 1720: The Spanish Villasur expedition from Mexico was massacred near Columbus, Nebraska, by the Pawnee tribe allied with the French.
- 1723: New Orleans became the third capital of French Louisiana.
- 1724: Étienne de Veniard, Sieur de Bourgmont, held a council with the Comanches against Spanish expeditions from Mexico.
- 1754: France and Britain started the French and Indian War.
- 1760: Britain effectively controlled all French colonies in Quebec.
- 1761: Spain supported France in the Seven Years' War expansion.

Louisiana (New Spain)

- 1762: Louis XV of France secretly proposed to Charles III of Spain that France give Louisiana to Spain in the Treaty of Fontainebleau.
- 1763: The Treaty of Paris ended the Seven Years' war, ceding various territories.
- 1763: The migration from Acadia (cajun) began with French settlers relocating to Spanish Louisiana.
- 1764: Pierre Laclede established a trading post in St. Louis, Missouri.
- 1764: Spain's acquisition of Louisiana was formally announced.
- 1765: Joseph Broussard led the first group of about 200 Acadians to St. Martinville, Louisiana.
- 1766: Antonio de Ulloa became the first Spanish ruler of Louisiana.
- 1768: Pro-French rebellion forced Governor Ulloa to abandon Louisiana.
- 1769: Alejandro O'Reilly suppressed the rebellion and enforced Spanish rule.
- 1770: Luis de Unzaga began the era of benign Spanish rule.
- 1770: Spain began administrative processes to govern Upper Louisiana.
- 1779: Spanish settlers, led by Francisco Bouligny, founded New Iberia along Bayou Teche.
- 1779: Spain declared war on Britain during the American Revolutionary War.
- 1780: The Battle of St. Louis was won by Spain.
- 1781: Spain completed its reconquest of Florida.
- 1783: The Treaty of Paris officially returned Florida to Spanish control.
- 1788: The Great New Orleans Fire destroyed much of the city.
- 1789: Reconstruction of New Orleans began.
- 1795: The Treaty of San Lorenzo established borders and navigation rights.
- 1795: Spain started scientific explorations on the Missouri River.
- 1798: Spain revoked the U.S.'s rights to the Mississippi River and New Orleans.
- 1799: The newly constructed Cabildo in New Orleans opened.

Louisiana (New France)

- 1800: In the Treaty of San Ildefonso, Napoleon secretly acquired the territory.
- 1801: The U.S. was allowed to use the port of New Orleans again.
- 1803: The Louisiana Purchase was announced by the U.S.
- 1803: Spain denied Lewis and Clark permission to travel the Missouri River.
- 1804: France officially took control, but the news did not reach St. Louis until March 10, 1804. This event is known as the "Three Flags Day" in Louisiana.
- 1804: The United States took control of Louisiana territory on 1 October 1804, forming the District of Louisiana.

== Remnants of Spanish control ==
Until the Adams-Onís Treaty, both Spain and the United States made claims over vast territories. By 1810, due to the weakening of Spain as a result of the American War of Independence and the Napoleonic Wars, U.S. troops demanded the retreat of Spanish detachments to the north of the Red River, currently situated in Oklahoma. However, in 1819, the U.S. agreed to maintain what is now known as the Oklahoma Panhandle and the territory between Texas and Oklahoma, referred to by the Americans as Miller County, as neutral territories.

On the other hand, the Americans relinquished their claims on the territories of Texas and the northwestern half of New Mexico. In return, Spain, which by then was rapidly losing its grip on the American continent, retained control over the entirety of New Mexico, all of Texas, and nearly two-thirds of what is present-day Colorado. Spain also gave up its claim on the western part of the current U.S. state of Louisiana, including the Neutral Zone between the Sabine River and the Hondo Creek.

The boundaries set by the Spanish-American treaty of 1819, which took effect in 1821 with Spain's withdrawal from St. Augustine on July 10 and Pensacola on July 17, were ratified by the U.S. with the First Mexican Empire and subsequently with the First Federal Republic. This status quo persisted until 1836 when Texas declared its independence.

== See also ==
- List of colonial governors of Louisiana
- Louisiana Creole people
- Spanish missions in Louisiana
