= Colonial history of Missouri =

The Colonial history of Missouri covers the French and Spanish exploration and colonization: 1673–1803, and ends with the American takeover through the Louisiana Purchase

== Early explorations and indigenous peoples ==
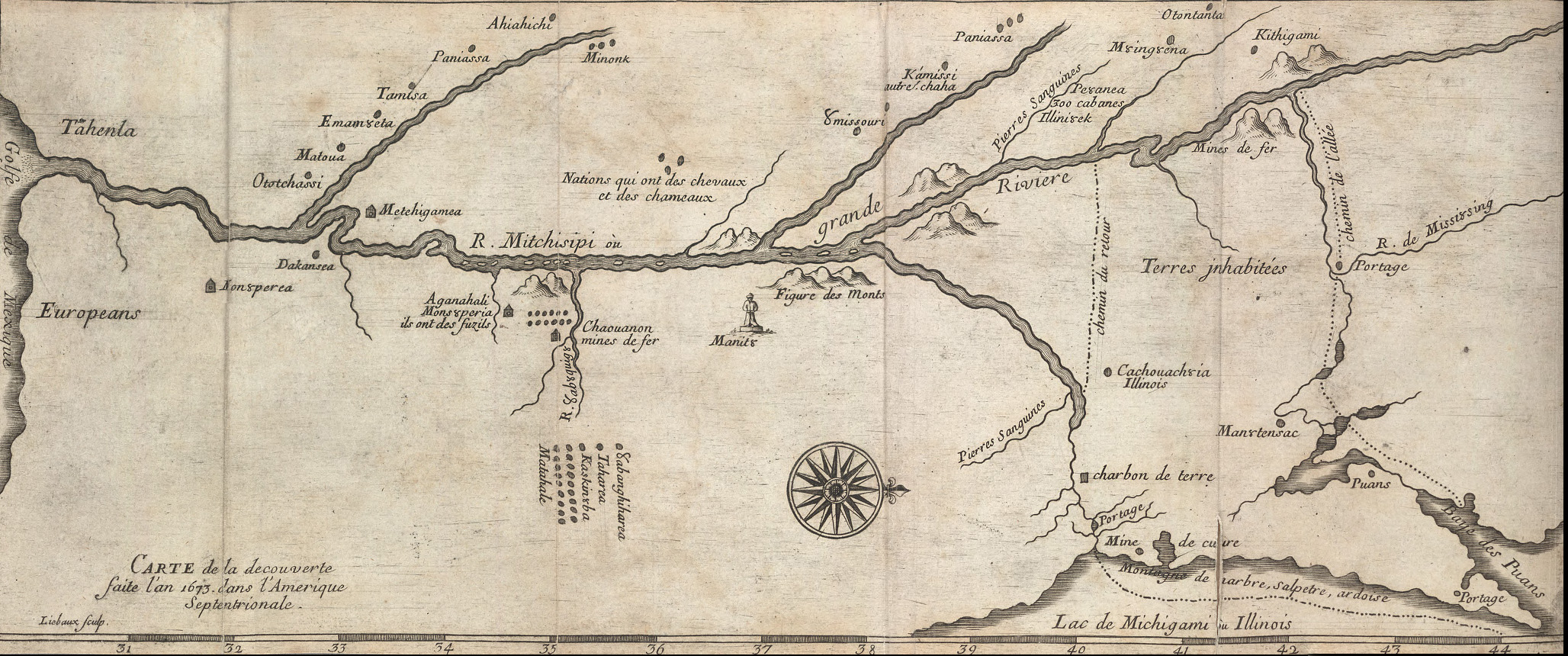
Map of the Marquette-Jolliet expedition of 1673 showing the first use of the word Missouri

In May 1673, Jesuit priest Jacques Marquette and French trader Louis Jolliet sailed down the Mississippi River in canoes along the area that would later become the state of Missouri. The earliest recorded use of "Missouri" is found on a map drawn by Marquette after his 1673 journey, naming both a group of Native Americans and a nearby river. However, the French rarely used the word to refer to the land in the region, instead calling it part of the Illinois Country. In 1682, after his successful journey from the Great Lakes to the mouth of the Mississippi River at the Gulf of Mexico, René-Robert Cavelier, Sieur de La Salle claimed the Louisiana Territory for France. During the journey, La Salle built several trading posts in the Illinois Country in an effort to create a trading empire; however, before La Salle could fully implement his plans, he died on a second journey to the region during a mutiny in 1685.

During the late 1680s and 1690s, the French pursued colonization of central North America not only to promote trade, but also to thwart the efforts of England on the continent. In that vein, Pierre Le Moyne d'Iberville and Jean-Baptiste Le Moyne, Sieur de Bienville established Biloxi in 1699 and Mobile in 1701 along the Gulf coast, while Antoine Laumet de La Mothe, sieur de Cadillac established Detroit in 1701 along the Great Lakes. From these outposts departed a variety of fur traders and Jesuit missionaries that enabled France to build strong relationships with indigenous tribes and retain control of the continental interior.

Although both Marquette and La Salle had passed Missouri on their journeys, neither had established bases of operations in what would become the state. Encouraged by the building of Mobile and Biloxi, the first to do so was Pierre Gabriel Marest, a Jesuit priest who in late 1700 established a mission on the west bank of the Mississippi River at the mouth of the River Des Peres. Marest established his mission station with a handful of French settlers and a large band of the Kaskaskia people, who fled from the eastern Illinois Country to the station in the hope of receiving French protection from the Iroquois. Marest became involved in learning their language and constructed several cabins, a chapel, and a basic fort at the station. However, bands of Sioux were angry at the encroachment of the Kaskaskia onto Sioux lands at Des Peres; these Sioux forced Marest to move the station south and east in 1703 to a new location in Illinois known as Kaskaskia.

From this time up until the building of the first railways in the Mississippi Basin in the mid-19th century, the Mississippi-Missouri river system waterways were the main means of communication and transportation in the region. The earliest traffic up the Missouri likely occurred in the 1680s by unlicensed fur traders; the first known ascent occurred in 1693, and within a decade, more than a hundred traders were moving along the Mississippi and Missouri. These early traders met two tribes within what would become Missouri: the Missouri and the Osage.

The Missouri were a semisedentary people with a major village along the Missouri River in northern Saline County, Missouri; they lived at the village primarily during the spring planting and fall harvesting seasons, while pursued game at other time. The Missouri became an ally of the French, eventually even traveling to Detroit to assist in the defense of the town against a Meskwaki attack. The Osage for their part became a more significant player in the development of Missouri history; they lived along the Osage River in Vernon County, Missouri and near the Missouri village in Saline County. Like the Missouri, the Osage lived in semi-permanent villages, and they also both had acquired horses.

The exposure to French activities brought significant changes to the indigenous peoples of Missouri. Although interactions were generally positive between them, the introduction of diseases, alcohol, and firearms proved detrimental to traditional lifestyles and cultures. The increased dependence on European goods altered cultural patterns of craft production, and an increased emphasis on hunting due to commercialism changed Osage marriage patterns. Younger Osage hunters who had achieved wealth from trade sought to increase their power in Osage society, and they at various times challenged the established political order of tribal elders. Although both the Osage and the Missouri were exposed to European diseases such as smallpox and typhus, the Osage suffered only slightly compared to the Missouri, who were drastically reduced in population.

== French settlement and government ==
During the 1710s, the French government again began to pursue a course of increased development of Louisiana. In August 1717, King Louis XV accepted the offer of Scottish financier John Law to create a joint stock company to manage colonial growth. Law's Mississippi Company (renamed the Company of the West in 1717 upon receiving its charter) was given a monopoly on all trade, ownership of all mines, and use of all military posts in Louisiana in return for a ten-year requirement to settle 6,000 white settlers and 3,000 black slaves in the territory. The Illinois Country, which included what is now Missouri, was also to be part of the charter. Investment in the company began in earnest, and in 1719, Law merged the Company of the West with several other joint stock companies to form the Company of the Indies. Appointed as provincial governor of Louisiana by the company, Jean-Baptiste Le Moyne, Sieur de Bienville founded the city of New Orleans in 1718, and the company appointed Pierre Dugué de Boisbriand as commander of the Illinois Country.

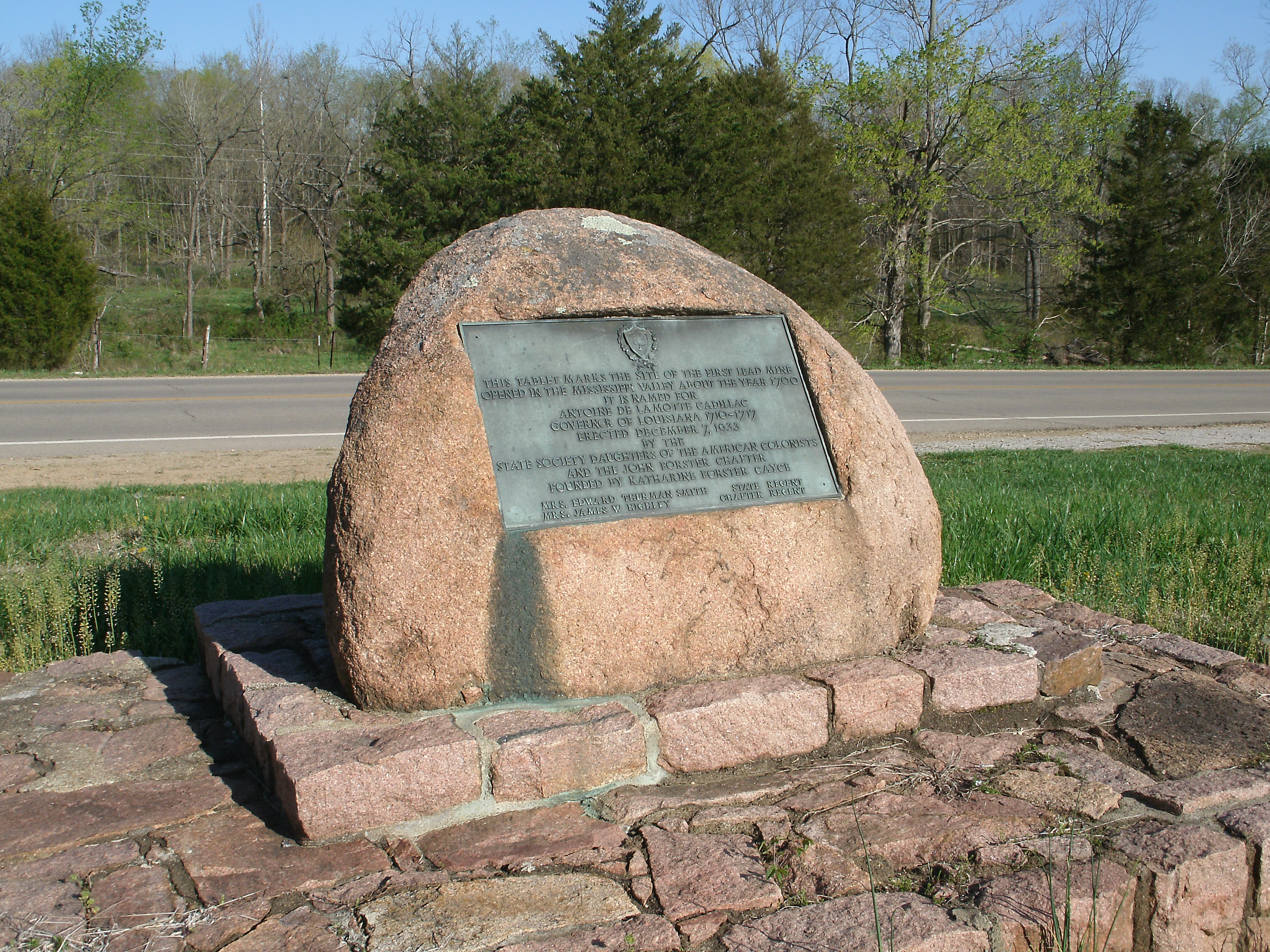
The location of Mine La Motte, the first mine in Missouri, opened by Antoine de la Mothe Cadillac in the 1710s and later expanded by Philip Francois Renault.

After Boisbriand's arrival in the Illinois Country, he ordered the construction of Fort de Chartres about eighteen miles north of Kaskaskia as the base of operations and headquarters for the company in the area. After the construction of Fort de Chartres, the company directed a series of prospecting expeditions to an area 30 miles west of the Mississippi River in present-day Madison, St. Francois, and Washington counties. These mining operations generally focused on discovering either lead or silver ore; the company appointed Philip Francois Renault as commander of the mines, and in 1723 Boisbriand ceded land to Renault in Washington County in an area now known as the Old Mines and in the Mine La Motte area. Because of the harshness of mine work, white laborers demanded high wages; in response, Renault brought five black slaves to work in the mines, the first black slaves in Missouri. Despite these efforts, weather and hostility from Indians slowed production, and Renault sold his lands in 1742 having made little profit.

Despite severe financial losses in late 1720, in January 1722 the company's directors sent Étienne de Veniard, Sieur de Bourgmont to Missouri to protect the company's trade networks on the Missouri River from Spanish influence. Bourgmont arrived in February 1723 with a poorly equipped force. In November 1723, Bourgmont and the party arrived in present-day Carroll County in northern Missouri, where they constructed Fort Orleans. Within a year, Bourgmont negotiated alliances with local Indian tribes along the Missouri River, and in 1725, he brought a party of them to show off in Paris. Fort Orleans was abandoned in 1728 as the company suffered severe losses and returned control of Louisiana to royal authority. During the 1730s and 1740s, French control over Missouri remained weak, and no permanent settlements existed on the western bank of the Mississippi River. Despite this lack of permanence, French fur traders continued to ascend the Missouri River and interact with indigenous peoples; one such duo, Paul and Pierre Mallet, journeyed from Missouri to Santa Fe, New Mexico in 1739. In 1744, the French commander of Fort de Chartres gave five years of fur trading rights along the Missouri River to Joseph Deruisseau, who built a small fort (Fort de Cavagnal) on the Missouri River near present-day Kansas City, Missouri. It disappeared by 1764.

French settlers remained on the east bank of the Mississippi at Kaskaskia and Fort de Chartres until 1750, when the new settlement of Ste. Genevieve, Missouri was begun, During its early years, Ste. Genevieve grew slowly due to its location on a muddy, flat, floodplain, and in 1752, the town had only 23 full-time residents. Despite its proximity to lead mines and salt springs, the majority of its population came as farmers during the 1750s and 1760s, and they primarily grew wheat, corn and tobacco.

== Spanish period 1762–1803 ==
=== Takeover ===
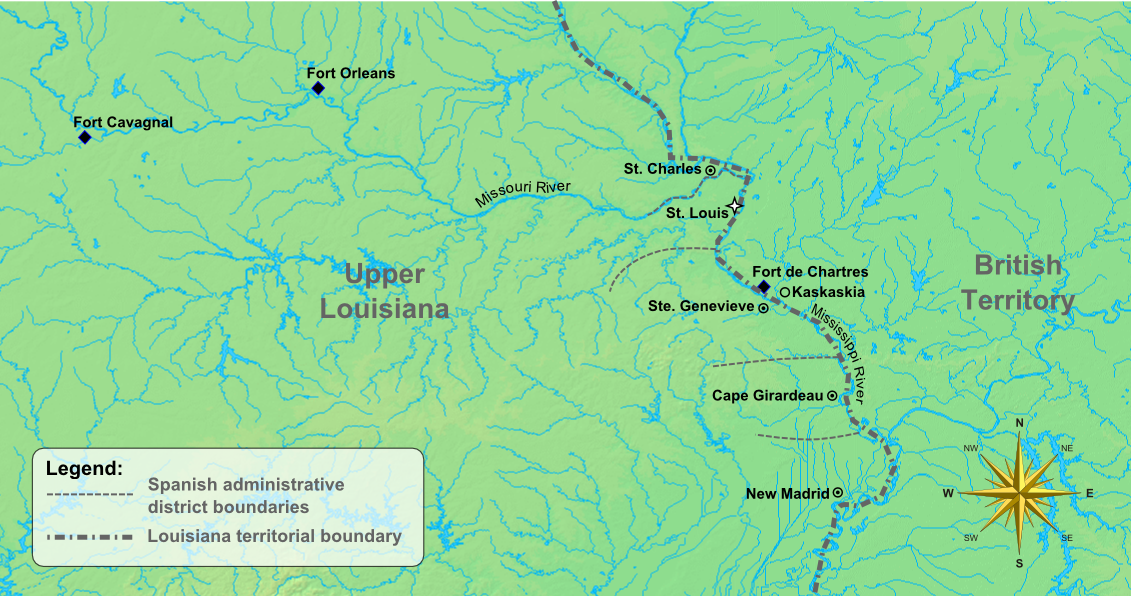
Map of early Missouri settlements and trading posts

Shortly after the founding of Ste. Genevieve, disputes between France and England over control of the Ohio Valley resulted in the outbreak of the French and Indian War in 1754. The British won and France lost all of its holdings. France gave Spain control of Louisiana in November 1762 in the Treaty of Fontainebleau. About 1000 French settlers lived in Missouri, in small farming villages stretched out along the Mississippi and Missouri rivers.

However, due to slow transit times, word of the Treaty of Fontainebleau did not arrive in Louisiana until 1765. In that period, the French governor of Louisiana granted a trade monopoly over Missouri to New Orleans merchant Gilbert Antoine de St. Maxent and his partner, Pierre Laclède. In August 1763, Laclede and his stepson Auguste Chouteau departed New Orleans for Missouri where in February 1764, they established St. Louis on high bluffs overlooking the Mississippi.

Although Laclede had brought the news in December 1763 of the transfer of the eastern Illinois Country to the United Kingdom, the French commander Pierre Joseph Neyon de Villiers only received his orders to begin evacuations in April 1764. Villiers departed for New Orleans in June 1764 with 80 families, and he transferred temporary control to his subordinate, Louis St. Ange de Bellerive, who was given the responsibility to monitor the remaining settlers in Illinois. Concern about living under British rule led many French settlers to decamp for Missouri, especially with encouragement from Laclede; upon the arrival of the British at Fort de Chartres in October 1765,. St. Ange was the interim commander of the entire upper Louisiana region until 1767.

Early settlements in Missouri
Settlement	Founding
Mine La Motte	1717 settlement
Ste. Genevieve	1750, 1735-1785
St. Louis	1764
Carondelet	1767, St. Louis annex 1870
St. Charles	1769
Mine à Breton	1770, 1760-1780
New Madrid	1783, 1789
Florissant	1786
Commerce	1788
Cape Girardeau	1792
Wolf Island	1792

=== Spanish rule ===
The first Spanish military commander, Captain Francisco Ríu y Morales, 1767–68, proved incompetent. Many of his soldiers grumbled and others deserted; rations ran short; he had trouble hiring laborers. Antonio de Ulloa, the first Spanish governor of Louisiana, was based in New Orleans, and he removed Ríu y Morales. The next rulers proved more confident, but even so, Spain was stretched to the limits in its ability to govern the vast region.

Both of Missouri's permanent settlements, Ste. Genevieve and St. Louis, were growing as a result of French immigration from British-held Illinois. Ste. Genevieve continued to suffer from periodic flooding, although during the 1770s its population of 600 made it slightly larger than St. Louis. Ste. Genevieve took a balanced approach between fur trading and farming.

Early St. Louis had a particular focus on fur trading, which led to periodic food shortages and the city's nickname of 'Paincourt', meaning short of bread. South of St. Louis a satellite city known as Carondelet was established in 1767, although it never thrived. A third major settlement was established in 1769, when Louis Blanchette, a Canadian trader, set up a trading post on the northwest bank of the Missouri River, which eventually grew into the town of St. Charles.

=== Competition with the British ===
Local administrators of Ste. Genevieve also were Spaniards, but frequently were forced to acquiesce to local customs. Throughout the 1770s, Spanish officials were forced to contend not only with the wishes of their predominantly French populations, but also with repeated incursions from British traders and hostile indigenous tribes. Furthermore, American settlers were starting to arrive.

To reduce the influence of British traders, Spain renewed efforts to encourage French settlers to decamp from Illinois to Missouri, and in 1778, the Spanish granted land and basic supplies to Catholic immigrants to Missouri; however, few settlers actually took up the offers to move to the region. A second effort by the Spanish against the British found greater success: starting in the late 1770s, the Spanish officials began openly supporting American rebels fighting against British rule in the American War of Independence. Spanish officials in both St. Louis and Ste. Genevieve were instrumental in supplying George Rogers Clark during his Illinois campaign of 1779.

However, Spanish aid to the Americans came with the risk of a British attack. In June 1779, Spain declared war on Britain. By March 1780, St. Louis was warned of an impending British attack, and the Spanish built Fort San Carlos. In late May 1780, a British war party attacked the town of St. Louis; although the town was saved, 21 were killed, 7 were wounded, and 25 were taken prisoner.

After the American victory in its war of independence, Spain retained Louisiana, but the region east of the Mississippi River became part of the United States. American settlers started coming across. Rather than attempt to stifle the immigration of American Protestants, however, Spanish officials began encouraging it in an effort to create an economically successful province.

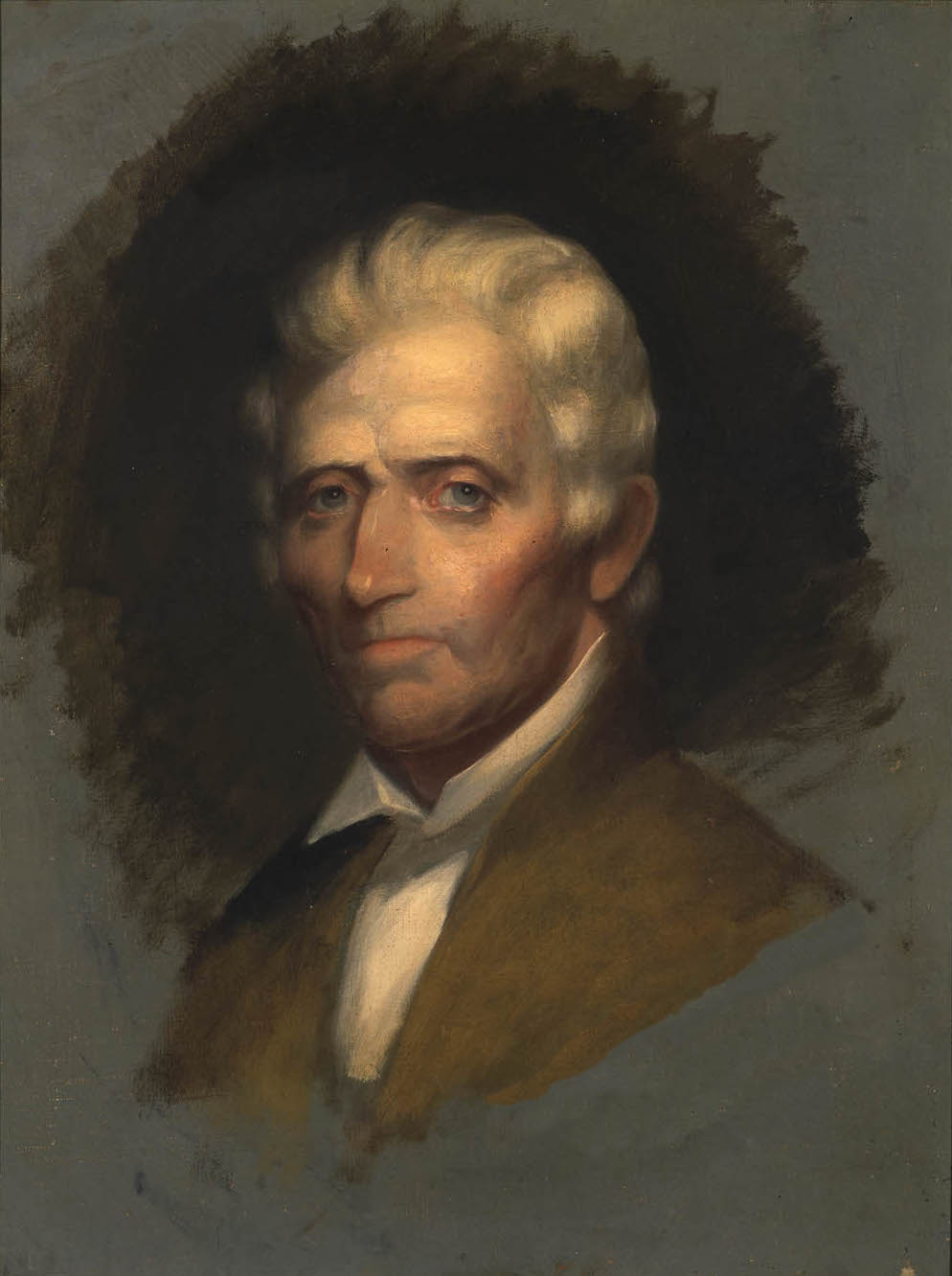
American pioneers such as Daniel Boone came to Spanish-controlled Missouri during the 1790s.

As part of this effort, in 1789 Spanish diplomats in Philadelphia encouraged George Morgan, an American military officer, to set up a semi-autonomous colony in southern Missouri across from the mouth of the Ohio River. Named New Madrid, the colony began auspiciously but was discouraged by Louisiana's governor, Esteban Rodríguez Miró, who considered Morgan's infant colony as flawed due to its lack of provisos for ensuring the settlement's loyalty to Spain. New Madrid's early American settlers departed, as did Morgan, and New Madrid became primarily a hunting and trading outpost rather than a full-fledged agricultural city.

In the early 1790s both Governor Miró and his successor, Francisco Luis Héctor de Carondelet, were cool toward the idea of American immigration to Missouri. However, with the onset of the Anglo-Spanish War in 1796, Spain again needed an influx of settlement to defend the region. To that end, Spain began advertising free land and no taxes in Spanish territory throughout American cities, and Americans responded in a wave of immigration. Among these American pioneers was Daniel Boone, who settled with his family after encouragement from the territorial governor.

To better govern the region of Missouri, the Spanish split the province into five administrative districts in the mid-1790s: St. Louis, St. Charles, Ste. Genevieve, Cape Girardeau and New Madrid. Of the five administrative districts, the newest was Cape Girardeau, founded in 1792 by trader Louis Lorimier as a trading post and settlement for newly arriving Americans. The largest district, St. Louis, was the provincial capital and center of trade; by 1800, its district population stood at nearly 2,500. Aside from Carondelet, other settlements in the St. Louis district included Florissant, located 15 miles northwest of St. Louis and settled in 1785, and Bridgeton, located 5 miles southwest of Florissant and settled in 1794. All three settlements were popular with immigrants from the United States.

American settlers fundamentally changed the makeup of Missouri; by the mid-1790s, Spanish officials realized the American Protestant immigrants were not interested in converting to Catholicism or in serious loyalty to Spain. Despite a brief attempt to restrict immigration to Catholics only, the heavy immigration from the United States changed the lifestyle and even the primary language of Missouri; by 1804, more than three-fifths of the population were American. With little return on their investment of time and money in the colony, the Spanish negotiated the return of Louisiana, including Missouri, to France in 1800, which was codified in the Treaty of San Ildefonso.

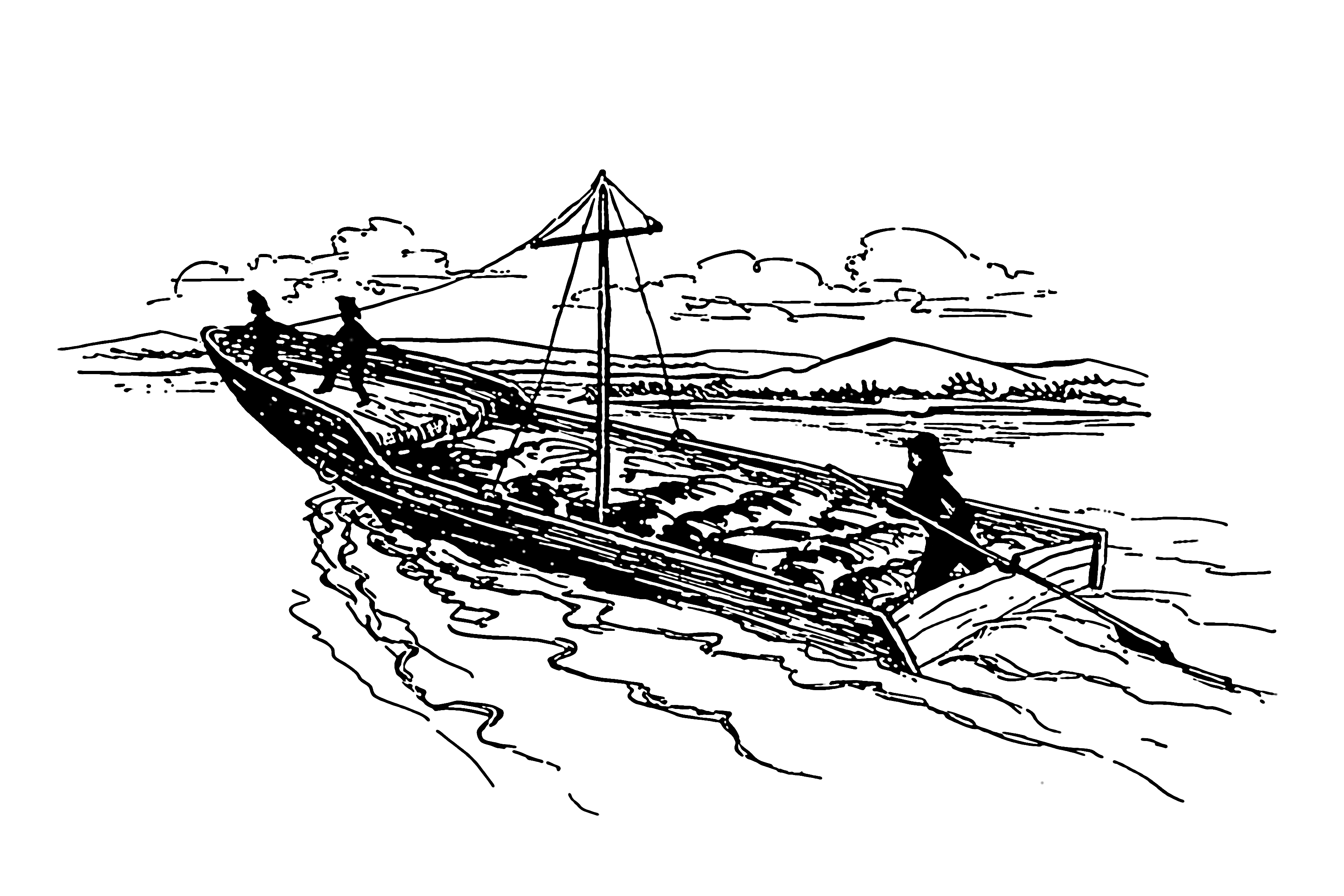
Most Missourians traveled longer distances by water, and large cargo was transported by bateaux (shown above).

By 1800, the population of Upper Louisiana was primarily concentrated in a few settlements along the Mississippi in present-day Missouri. Travel between towns was by the river. Subsistence agriculture was the primary economic activity, although most farmers also raised livestock. Fur trading, lead mining, and salt making were also significant economic activities for residents during the 1790s.

=== Social life in Spanish Missouri ===
Religion in Spanish Missouri was a strong element of cultural life, and the Catholic Church had been a significant part of life among the colonists since the earliest settlements. Although the Jesuits were the primary religious authority in the region, the French expelled the order in 1763 due to its growing wealth and power. Combined with the expulsion of the Jesuits, the transfer of the colony to Spain also caused a shortage of priests, as French priests under Canadian jurisdiction were prohibited from conducting services. Through 1773, Missouri parishes lacked resident priests, and residents were served by traveling priests from the east side of the Mississippi. During the 1770s and 1780s, both Ste. Genevieve and St. Louis gained resident priests, although not without difficulty; during the 1790s, St. Charles and Florissant were forced to share a resident priest, despite both having built parish churches. Throughout the period, both the French and the Spanish provided monetarily for the sustenance of the church; as part of their support, both governments forbade Protestant services in the colony. However, itinerant Protestant ministers frequently visited the settlements in private, and restrictions on Protestant residency were rarely enforced. According to historian William E. Foley, Spanish Missouri lived under a "de facto form of religious toleration," with few residents demanding rigid orthodoxy.

Social class was particularly fluid during the Spanish period, although there were some distinctions. There were no aristocrats. The highest class was based upon wealth and constituted of a mixed group of creole merchants linked by familial ties. Below this class were the artisans and craftsmen of the society, followed by laborers of all types, including boatmen, hunters, and soldiers. Near the bottom of the social system were free blacks, servants, and coureur des bois, with black and Indian slaves forming the bottom class.

Crime and social indiscretions also were a part of life in Spanish Missouri; however, government officials quickly dealt with those who broke social norms. In 1770, when a trader mocked Spanish regulations outside the church in St. Louis, he was banished from the colony for ten years; the same year, a laborer was banished for stealing and illicit relations with slave women. During the late 1770s, a series of robberies was ended by the institution of nightly patrols in St. Louis. Spanish soldiers often were responsible for the major crimes; in 1775, a soldier killed a Ste. Genevieve resident in a drunken knife fight, while soldiers in St. Louis frequently were accused of fighting, drunkenness, and stealing.

Women in the region were responsible for a variety of domestic tasks, including food preparation and making clothing. French women were well known for their cooking, which incorporated both French staples such as soups and fricassées and African and Creole foods such as gumbo. The colonists also ate local meats, including deer, squirrel, rabbits, and bear, although they preferred beef, pork and fowl. Most foods were local, although sugar and liquor were imported until the late Spanish period.

Women were responsible for child-rearing and basic schooling, and for nursing the sick. Diseases such as malaria, whooping cough, and scarlet fever were frequent maladies throughout the period, with malaria particularly affecting low-lying settlements such as Ste. Genevieve. Smallpox only affected the settlements late in the 1700s. Schools were private and classes were tutor-based; small schools operated intermittently during the 1780s and 1790s in both St. Louis and Ste. Genevieve, and a private English-language school opened in New Madrid during the late 1790s. The wealthiest families sometimes sent children to other regions to obtain education: François Vallé of Ste. Genevieve sent his son to New York City in 1796, while Auguste Chouteau sent his eldest son to Canada in 1802.

The black enslaved population of Missouri and the region was 38% in 1772, declining to 20% by 1803. Slaves worked in households as servants, and in mines, fields, and in transportation. French and Spanish law provided them certain protections for what was considered an economic investment, such as prohibitions on imprisonment, mutilation, and death. Spanish law permitted them to own property, appear as parties to lawsuits, work on their own account, and purchase their freedom.

The food supply was ample, wars were infrequent, and fertility was high so the French population grew to about 10,000 by 1803.

== See also ==
- List of commandants of the Illinois Country
- History of the Midwestern United States
- Timeline of St. Louis
- Timeline of Missouri
