= Louis Groston de Saint-Ange de Bellerive =

3rd Commandant of Upper Louisiana
- Incumbent
- Assumed office 1770
- Preceded by: Pedro Piernas
- Succeeded by: Pedro Piernas

16th Commandant of Illinois Country
- In office 1764–1770
- Preceded by: Pierre-Joseph Neyon de Villiers
- Succeeded by: Pedro Piernas

Personal details
- Born: 1700 Montreal
- Died: 1774 (aged 73–74)
- Profession: Soldier, Commandants of Upper Louisiana

Louis Groston de Saint-Ange de Bellerive (1700–1774), was an officer in the French marine troops in New France.

== Biography ==
Born in Montreal in 1700, Louis Groston de Saint-Ange de Bellerive followed his father, Robert Groston de Saint-Ange, to Fort Saint-Joseph in 1720. In 1723, he accompanied the explorer Étienne de Veniard along the banks of the Missouri River and the Platte River, and assisted in the construction of Fort Orleans.

Louis served as a military officer until 1736, when his father asked the Governor of Louisiana, Jean-Baptiste Le Moyne de Bienville, to promote him to lieutenant and commander of Fort Vincennes, replacing François-Marie Bissot, who was killed in an Indian raid. Louis received that promotion and remained commander of the fort until 1764. He was promoted to captain in 1748.

On May 18, 1764, Louis Groston de Saint-Ange de Bellerive surrendered Fort Vincennes to the British under the terms of the Treaty of Paris of 1763. He then took command of Fort de Chartres.

On October 10, 1765, he surrendered Fort de Chartres to the British. He took his regiment to Saint-Louis, Missouri, a part of French Louisiana that had been yielded to the Spanish, who were not yet in control of the full territory.

In 1770, he swore allegiance to the Spanish Governor, and became a captain in the Spanish army, where he continued to serve until his death in 1774.

== Legacy ==
Bellerive Country Club in suburban St. Louis is named for him; its golf course has hosted three major championships. The club's previous location (1910–1959) near Normandy is now a village called Bellerive.
