= Louis St. Ange Bellerive =

French-Canadian frontiersman and soldier

Captain Louis St. Ange de Bellerive (born 1702) was influential in the founding and early years of St. Louis, Missouri.

== Early life ==
Louis St Ange de Bellerive was born in La Prairie, Quebec in 1702. He was the son of Robert Grotton-St. Ange and Marguerite-Louise Crevier.

Born in about 1698, Bellerive spent the first few years of his life in Montreal with his family. However, he spent more of his childhood and teenage years growing up on the frontier. His father, Robert Groston St. Ange, assisted a French Jesuit named Father Charlevoix while traveling up and down the Mississippi River. In addition, Bellerive's elder brother Pierre enlisted as a soldier in the Illinois Country. Though this ended badly for Pierre, being burned to death by the local Indians, he inspired Bellerive to join the forces as well. Bellerive accompanied Etienne de Bourgmont as part of the French army on his expedition to establish Fort Orleans. This was in response to the potential threat of the Spanish continuing to grow and overpower the French in their location. It was during this time that Bellerive met various Indians and formed many friendships that proved to be helpful later in his life.

in 1736, Bellerive was put in charge of the Post Vincennes on the Wabash River. Staying for 28 years, Bellerive helped to keep the peace between the different groups in the area, such as British, French, and Indians. From his past experiences, Bellerive was able to artfully wind his way through the intricacies of the diplomatic nature of the position.

== Involvement in St. Louis ==
Upon moving to St. Louis later in his life, Bellerive ran a provincial capital. Many people were moving to St. Louis for the religious freedom aspects of the new community. Bellerive used his past experiences of diplomatic relations to help converse with members from the different governments.

== Personal life ==
Bellerive never married, and instead had a life-time lover, Angelique, his Indian slave. While working in St. Louis, he lived in Marie-Thérèse Bourgeois Chouteau's house, and oftentimes, told stories from earlier in his life of adventures.
