= Robert Groston de Saint-Ange =

New France military commandant (1686–1738)

8th Commandant of the Illinois Country
- In office 1730–1734
- Monarch: Louis XV
- Preceded by: Pierre Dugué de Boisbriand
- Succeeded by: Pierre D'Artaguiette

Personal details
- Born: Châtillon-sur-Seine, Champagne, France
- Spouses: Marguerite Crevier (m. 1692; died 1707); Élisabeth Chorel de Saint Romain (m. 1718)
- Children: Louis Groston de Saint-Ange de Bellerive; Plus 5 other sons and 3 daughters

Military service
- Allegiance: France
- Years of service: 1686–1738
- Rank: Captain
- Battles/wars: Second Fox War

Robert Groston de Saint-Ange (fl. 1686–1738) was a French military officer and commandant in the Illinois Country of New France.

== Early life ==
Robert Groston (spelled alternatively as "Grotton") was born c. 1665 in Châtillon-sur-Seine. He was the son of Jean Grotton, a master baker. Although it is unknown when he left France, in 1686, he was a sargeant in Canada and calling himself Robert Grotton-St Ange.

== Biography ==
Robert Groston, born in France, came to Canada sometime around 1686, although little is recorded about his service at that time. By 1721, Groston was in Illinois Country where he met the Jesuit explorer Charlevoix, accompanying the priest on his journey down the Mississippi River to New Orleans. In May 1722, Groston was commissioned as an ensign and in December was promoted to lieutenant. In 1733, he joined Veniard de Bourgmont's expidention up the Missouri River to establish Fort Orleans.

In 1724, Groston joined the initial expedition from Fort Orleans to meet with the Kaw and Comanche, which was aborted after most of the French grew ill. He remained as commander of Fort Orleans during Bourgmont's second expedition. By 1729, Groston and his family had moved to Fort de Chartres and he was put in command of the fort in 1730.

In August 1730, during the Second Fox War, Groston led an attack on a Meskwaki stronghold along a creek in what is now east-central Illinois. He marched from Fort de Chartres With some 100 French soldiers and militia men, picking up some 400 Native American allies on the way. Locating the Meskawaki stronghold, Groston was joined by de Villiers from Fort St. Joseph and de Noyelles from Miami outpost. The French and their allies besieged the stronghold for 23 days before the Meskwaki tried to break out during a violent thunderstorm. More than 300 Meskwaki warriors were killed or captured in the failed escape attempt, along with an unrecorded number of women and children.

For the next four years, Groston served as governor of the Illinois Country, retiring in 1734. In 1738, he was commissioned as a captain. Although a specific date is not recorded, he died at some point before November 1743.

== Personal life ==
Groston married the widow Marguerite Crevier in 1692 and they had six sons and two daughters by the time she died in 1707 and was buried in Montreal. Their sixth son, Louis, followed his father into military service. In 1718, he married Élisabeth Chorel de Saint Romain, and they had one daughter.

== Name ==
Groston's name is rendered in some sources as 'Grotton'. In contemporary records, he is sometimes referred to as dit Saint-Ange instead of de Saint-Ange, implying that the use of the nobility particle de was self-applied and not an indication of elevated or noble status. The Saint-Ange of his name refers to the Côte Saint-Ange near Chicoutimi, Saguenay, Quebec.

== Bibliography ==
- Ekberg, Carl J.; Person, Sandra K. (2015). St. Louis Rising: The French Regime of Louis St. Ange de Bellerive. Urbana, IL: University of Illinois Press. ISBN 978-0-252-03897-6.
