= Francisco Rui =

1ª Commandants of Upper Louisiana
- In office 1767–1768
- Succeeded by: Pedro Piernas

Personal details
- Born: Unknown
- Died: 1790
- Profession: Administrator (commander governor of Illinois, commander of St. Louis)

Francisco Rui (Ríos) y Morales was a Spanish soldier who served as Commandant Governor of Illinois (between 1767 and 1768).

== Biography ==
Rui joined the Spanish Army in his youth, eventually reaching Commandant grade.

In 1767 Rui was appointed Commandant governor of Illinois, arriving in New Orleans the same year. He was official commandant of Missouri county. On January 7, 1767, Louisiana governor Antonio de Ulloa, gave secret instructions to Rui, about the construction of two forts at the confluence of the Missouri and Mississippi Rivers. Spanish troops and workmen arrived with orders to build the forts. Fort Don Carlos el Senor Principe de Asturias was built on the south bank of the Missouri. Rui occupied the fort on the Missouri until August 4, 1767 or in 1769. (according to the sources).

Rui left office of Lieutenant governor of Illinois in 1768 and was replaced by Colonel Pedro Piernas.

== See also ==
- Louisiana Purchase
- History of Missouri (1673–1803)
