= Michel-Sidrac Dugué de Boisbriand =

Canadian politician

Seigneur Michel-Sidrac Dugué de Boisbriand

11th Governor of Montreal
- In office Spring 1670 – August 1670
- Monarch: Louis XIV
- Preceded by: Pierre de Lamotte de Saint-Paul
- Succeeded by: François-Marie Perrot

Personal details
- Born: April 1638 Puceul, Kingdom of France
- Died: December 18, 1688 (aged 50) Montreal, New France
- Children: Pierre Dugué de Boisbriand

Military service
- Allegiance: Kingdom of France
- Branch/service: French Royal Army
- Years of service: c. 1665–1668
- Rank: Captain
- Unit: Montagu regiment Chambellé regiment Carignan-Salières Regiment

Michel-Sidrac Dugué de Boisbriand (French pronunciation: [miʃɛl sidʁak dyɡe də bwabʁijɑ̃]; c. 1638 – December 1688) was a soldier and seigneur in New France who briefly served as interim governor of Montreal in 1670. His son Pierre Dugué de Boisbriand was a French colonial Governor of Louisiana.

== Biography ==
The son of Pierre Dugué de La Boulardière and of Perrine de Chambellé, he was born and baptized in Puceul, near Nantes, in the Kingdom of France in 1638.

He started his military career in the Montagu regiment as a lieutenant. Later, he became a captain in the Chambellé regiment under his uncle's command. His company was incorporated into the Carignan-Salières Regiment by Louis XIV and sent to Quebec City in New France where they arrived in September 1665. Dugué served as Governor of Montreal from spring until August 1670, when François-Marie Perrot arrived. In 1672, he was granted the seigneury of Senneville, which he sold in 1679. Later in 1672, he gained the title to Île Sainte-Thérèse and, in 1683, acquired the seigneury of Mille-Îles. He took part in expeditions for Governors Frontenac in 1673 and Brisay de Denonville in 1684 and 1687; he also participated in the fur trade.

Dugué died in Montreal, New France in 1688.

== Family ==
On 7 November 1667, he married Marie Moyen. His son Pierre was a founding father of colonial Louisiana and served as acting governor of Louisiana. His daughter Marie-Thérèse Dugué de Boisbriand married Charles-Gaspard Piot de Langloiserie.

== Legacy ==
The city of Boisbriand, a suburb of Montreal, was named after him.
