= Barthélemy de Macarty Mactigue =

9th Commandant of Upper Louisiana
- In office 1751–1760
- Preceded by: Jean-Baptiste Benoit de Saint-Clair
- Succeeded by: Pierre-Joseph Neyon de Villiers

Personal details
- Born: 1706 Nimes, France
- Died: February 14, 1781 (aged 74–75)
- Profession: Soldier, Commandants of Upper Louisiana

Barthélemy Louis Daniel de Macarty Mactigue (1706 - February 14, 1781), was an officer of the French army, captain of a ship, port captain and governor of Upper Louisiana.

== Biography ==
Barthélemy de Macarty Mactigue was a Frenchman of Irish origin. His father, Théodore Maccartey-Mactaig, was an Irish regimental captain who took refuge in France due to religious tyranny, entered the French Navy and became major general of Rochefort-sur-Mer and commander of the Château de Crussol.

In 1723 Barthélemy de Macarty Mactigue joined the cadets of the musketeers. He later became aide-de-camp. In 1732, he was sent to French Louisiana with his older brother Jean Jacques de Macarty Mactigue, born in Nîmes in 1698. He fought under the governor of French Louisiana Jean-Baptiste Le Moyne de Bienville. He was appointed captain of the troops on 14 September 1735.

In 1744 Barthélemy de Macarty Mactigue was appointed post captain at La Rochelle.

On April 1, 1745, the Council of the Navy appointed him captain of the Port of Quebec with the rank of lieutenant of frigate. He replaced René Le Gardeur de Beauvais, who had died in the French colony of Saint-Domingue, the future Haiti. In the summer of 1745, he was to embark on board the le Gironde, but since this ship was unable to sail, he remained in France until 1747. In 1747 he was able to sail to Canada with six other warships. Barthélemy de Macarty Mactigue commanded le Rubis. This 26-gun frigate was part of the convoy that was taking Jacques-Pierre de Taffanel de La Jonquière, the Governor of New France, to Quebec.

Along the way, they encountered an armada of about fifteen English ships and the First Battle of Cape Finisterre (1747) began. The Rubis surrendered only after fierce resistance. This action earned Barthélemy de Macarty Mactigue the rank of captain of Fire ship on 1 April 1748. On June 14, 1748, he married Françoise Hélène Pellerin. He moved to New Orleans and placed himself under the orders of Governor Pierre de Rigaud de Vaudreuil.

On July 16, 1750, he was elevated to the rank of knight of the Order of Saint-Louis

On March 1, 1751, Barthélemy de Macarty Mactigue was promoted to lieutenant. He was appointed commander of the Fort de Chartres, located in the Illinois Country, as well as governor of Upper Louisiana following the death of the previous governor Claude de Bertet in 1749. The latter was replaced at short notice by an interim governor, Jean-Baptiste Benoit de Saint-Clair, who governed until 1751. After of Saint-Clair, Barthélemy de Macarty Mactigue assumed the government until 1760.

On 17 April 1757, he was appointed captain of the ship. On 1 July 1759 he was elevated to the rank of Lieutenant of the King.

In 1760, he was replaced by Pierre Joseph Neyon de Villiers as governor of the Illinois and Upper Louisiana.

== Sources ==
- Lacour-Gayet, Georges (1902). La Marine militaire de la France sous le règne de Louis XV. Honoré Champion éditeur.
