= Pierre Dugué de Boisbriand =

French colonial governor of Louisiana

7th Commandant of the Illinois Country
- In office 1718–1725
- Monarch: Louis XV
- Preceded by: Pierre-Charles de Liette
- Succeeded by: Robert de Saint-Ange

7th French Governor of Louisiana
- In office 1724–1726
- Monarch: Louis XV
- Preceded by: Jean-Baptiste Le Moyne, Sieur de Bienville
- Succeeded by: Étienne Perier

Personal details
- Born: February 21, 1675 Ville-Marie, New France
- Died: June 7, 1736 (aged 61) France
- Parent: Michel-Sidrac Dugué de Boisbriand (father)
- Relatives: Pierre Le Moyne d'Iberville (cousin)

Military service
- Allegiance: Kingdom of France
- Branch/service: French Army
- Years of service: 1694–1726
- Rank: First King's Lieutenant
- Battles/wars: Nine Years' War

Pierre Dugué de Boisbriand (French pronunciation: [pjɛʁ dyɡe də bwabʁijɑ̃]; 21 February 1675 – 7 June 1736) was a French Canadian soldier, politician, and aristocrat who commanded several areas in North America colonized by New France in the early 18th Century and who served as the seventh governor of the French colony of Louisiana.

== Biography ==
Pierre Dugué de Boisbriand was born 21 February 1675 to Michel-Sidrac Dugué de Boisbriand and Marie Moyen Des Granges in Montreal, New France.

He began his military career in 1691 as half pay ensign during King William's War. In 1694, he was promoted to full ensign. In 1695 he served as the second-in-command to Captain Saint-Ours. The next year, he participated in an attack on Newfoundland alongside his cousin Pierre Le Moyne d'Iberville and in 1697 he joined d'Iberville's expedition to recapture Fort Bourbon.

In September 1697 de Boisbriand traveled to France after the Peace of Ryswick. In 1699, he accompanied Pierre Le Moyne d'Iberville on the frigate Renommée and helped found Fort Mississippi. In 1699, he served as the town major for Biloxi. In 1700, he moved to Mobile and aided in the construction of Fort Louis de La Louisiane. In 1702, he received a grant of land in the Mobile. In 1704, he and 25 French soldiers escorted members of the Chickasaw tribe to a peace conference with the Choctaw tribe. During the conference the Choctaw delegates killed the Chickasaw delegates and they later escorted the French soldiers back to Mobile. In 1714, he was considered by Jean-Baptiste Le Moyne de Bienville for the position of commander of Fort Saint-Jérôme, but Louis Poncereau de Chavagne de Richebourg was appointed to the position instead. In 1716 he was promoted to garrison adjutant for Mobile and the next year he was appointed commandant of Mobile. In 1717, he traveled to Paris; he returned to Louisiana in spring of 1718 with a commission as first king’s lieutenant and as a member of the council of Louisiana. By the end of the year he was the commandant of the Illinois County.

In 1718, Dugué led an expedition to the Jesuit mission at Kaskaskia, Illinois. The next year established Fort de Chartres near the town. From 1725-1727, Dugué served in New Orleans as Governor of Louisiana after his predecessor Bienville was removed over mismanagement allegations. Dugué was recalled to France in the 1729 to answer charges of mismanagement. He lost his military commission, but was later awarded a pension by the king. He died in France on June 7, 1736.

While commandant of Fort de Chartres, Dugué conveyed land nearby to his nephew, Ste. Therese Langlois, who founded the town of Prairie du Rocher ("Prairie of the Rock") on the site. The town is one of the oldest French colonial communities to survive into the 21st Century in the American Midwest.

Preceded by Jean-Baptiste le Moyne de Bienville	French Governor of Louisiana; 1725–1727	Succeeded by Étienne Perier
