= Pedro Piernas =

18th-century Spanish military official

2nd Commandant of Upper Louisiana
- In office 1768–?
- Preceded by: Francisco Rui
- Succeeded by: Louis Saint-Ange de Bellerive

1st Lieutenant Governor of Upper Louisiana
- In office 1770–1775
- Succeeded by: Francisco Cruzat

Personal details
- Born: San Sebastian, Spain
- Died: Unknown
- Profession: Soldier, lieutenant governor of Illinois and commander of St. Louis

Pedro Joseph Piernas was a Spanish military official who rose to the rank of commandant in 1768 and served as Lieutenant governor of Illinois between 1770 and 1775.

== Biography ==
In 1747, Pedro Piernas is believed to have joined the Spanish Army and he probably obtained the ranks of infantry captain, colonel, commandant, and lieutenant.

Piernas had already ruled Upper Louisiana in 1768, but he arrived in Saint Louis on March 10, 1769 . In August of that year, he was appointed Lieutenant Governor of Illinois by Alejandro O'Reilly. The French commandant of the village, Louis Groston de Saint-Ange de Bellerive, transferred formal control to Piernas on May 20, 1770. St. Ange was then named assistant to Piernas and special adviser on Amerindian affairs. Piernas also made St. Ange an infantry captain in the service of the Spanish Crown and maintained friendly relations with him. After the transfer, Piernas confirmed St. Ange's and Laclède's land grants. He rented Laclède's headquarters as government offices, with Spanish soldiers providing local security.

When Piernas assumed the office of Lieutenant Governor of Upper Louisiana, he realized that the population rejected the Spanish government. (Louisiana was French territory until the colony passed into Spanish hands under the terms of the Treaty of Paris at the end of the Seven Years' War) in 1763. Piernas immediately began working to reconcile the provincial public to the Spanish government; although he changed very little in the government of the colony, he introduced some new regulations that benefited the population.

Additionally, Piernas appointed Martin Duralde as Land surveyor to establish conclusive proof of the provincial borders. The appointment of a Frenchman as surveyor was unexpected and supported by the population. Piernas also publicly registered all donations that he had made without any legal requirement to do so. These acts of power, combined with a less oppressive government and the incorporation of French people in many subordinate offices, helped Piernas gain support as the new Spanish governor.

In 1772, in an attempt to control the Osages and Missouri tribes, he banned trade with them, and British merchants from Canada began to trade with them instead. In 1773, Piernas sent a troop of forty men led by fur trader Pierre Laclede to capture the crew of the British merchant of furs Jean-Marie Ducharme. After the capture, the British managed to escape and emigrated to Canada. Piernas also sent soldiers up the river with wampum (shell beads used as a native money for the Eastern Woodlands tribes) belts to enlist the aid of the chiefs against the American interlopers.

Unlike the French, who respected and traded with local Amerindians, Piernas was standoffish and less diplomatic. In 1773, he invited a Shawnee chief to St. Louis to sign a treaty. It was designed to create a barrier between St. Louis and the tribes near Ste Genevieve. His followers, who were all dressed in their traditional clothing, accompanied the chief. After a series of threats, an Osage warrior was called upon to fight against Piernas, who imprisoned the Shawnee chief.

In 1774, a small prison was built by Piernas against the stone structure that Laclede had originally built as the headquarters of trade and as his residence. He also built a small chapel to replace the tent that was formally used for services and encourage a Capuchin friar, Father Valentin, to live in the village as their primary resident priest. His friend and aide, Benito Vasquez, provided a new bell in Piernas’honor for the new church, dubbed "Pierre Joseph congratulated."

Piernas left office as Lieutenant Governor of Illinois in 1775, being replaced by Colonel Francisco Cruzat.

== Personal life ==
Piernas married a French woman named Portneuf, which may have also contributed to his popularity with the French residents of the colony. Their house was one of the first built in St. Louis.
