= Fernando de Leyba =

Lieutenant Governor of Upper Louisiana from 1778 to 1780

Lieutenant colonel Fernando de Leyba

3rd Lieutenant Governor of Upper Louisiana
- In office June 14, 1778 – June 28, 1780
- Monarch: Charles III
- First Secretary of State: Count of Floridablanca
- Secretary of State for the Indies: José de Gálvez
- Viceroy of New Spain: Antonio María de Bucareli; Francisco Romá y Rosell (as Regent of the Audiencia); Martín de Mayorga
- Captain General of Cuba: Diego José Navarro García de Valladares
- Governor of Louisiana: Bernardo de Gálvez
- Preceded by: Francisco Cruzat
- Succeeded by: Francisco Cruzat

Personal details
- Born: Fernando de Leyba y Córdova Vizcaigaña; July 24, 1734 Ceuta, Spanish Empire
- Died: July 28, 1780 (aged 46) St. Louis, Spanish Empire
- Resting place: St. Louis
- Spouse: María Concepción de Zasar (m. 1767)
- Children: 2

Military service
- Allegiance: Spain
- Branch: (Spain) Spanish Army
- Years of service: 1752–1780
- Rank: Lieutenant colonel
- Unit: Louisiana Fixed Infantry Regiment
- Battles: Seven Years' War; Siege of Havana (POW); American Revolutionary War; Battle of St. Louis

Lieutenant Colonel Fernando de Leyba y Córdova Vizcaigaña (July 24, 1734 – June 28, 1780) was a Spanish Army officer who served as the third lieutenant governor of Upper Louisiana from 1778 until his death in 1780. He successfully defended the village of St. Louis during the American Revolutionary War.

== Military career ==
Little is known of Fernando de Leyba's life until his appointment to the lieutenant governor's position on June 14, 1778. Immediately upon his appointment to the post, he was ordered by Bernardo de Galvez to keep abreast of events occurring in the American Revolutionary War, and to keep any correspondence with an American chief secret and report it at once to him. He met George Rogers Clark barely two months later, when Clark, fresh from his victory at Kaskaskia, visited St. Louis and met with the governor. Fearing an attack from Detroit, Clark suggested that De Leyba fortify the town; upon being notified of this, Galvez responded that De Leyba would have to make do on his own, as no fortifications would be provided.

After war was declared on Great Britain, the British launched a retaliatory strike on the provincial capitol of Upper Louisiana. Given fair warning, De Leyba managed to raise 1000 piastres, including 400 of his own money, for the construction of Fort San Carlos. Already deep in debt from his gifts to the Indians, De Leyba could ill afford paying for the entire fortification on his own. In any event, one tower was completed, with part of a second also built. This was enough to repel the enemy, who attacked St. Louis on May 26, 1780.

== Death and legacy ==
De Leyba's health was already deteriorating and on June 28, 1780, he died. His after action report on the battle of St. Louis would not reach Galvez until after De Leyba's death, yet the governor was sufficiently impressed enough to recommend De Leyba for promotion to the rank of lieutenant colonel, posthumously.

Afterwards, many of the villagers from the area around St. Louis began to blame him for their troubles, writing anonymous letters to the government in New Orleans detailing his supposed misbehaviors. Some people began calling him a "Spanish Benedict Arnold". In 1831, one historian Judge, Wilson Primm, wrote a lecture in which he stated that the governor had not only sold the gunpowder stores to the enemy, he had acted in a cowardly manner during the engagement and deliberately impeded the defense of the village. Supported by accounts made by survivors some fifty years after the battle, these accusations were accepted by many historians for much of the nineteenth century, and it is only recently that some have begun to reconsider the role De Leyba played in the defense of the American frontier.

Military offices
Preceded by Lieutenant Joseph Orieta	Commandant of Arkansas Post; 1771–1774	Succeeded by Captain Joseph Orieta
Government offices
Preceded by Francisco Cruzat	Lieutenant Governor of Upper Louisiana; 1778–1780	Succeeded by Francisco Cruzat
