= Francisco Cruzat =

Francisco Cruzat François Cruzat Don Francisco Cruzado
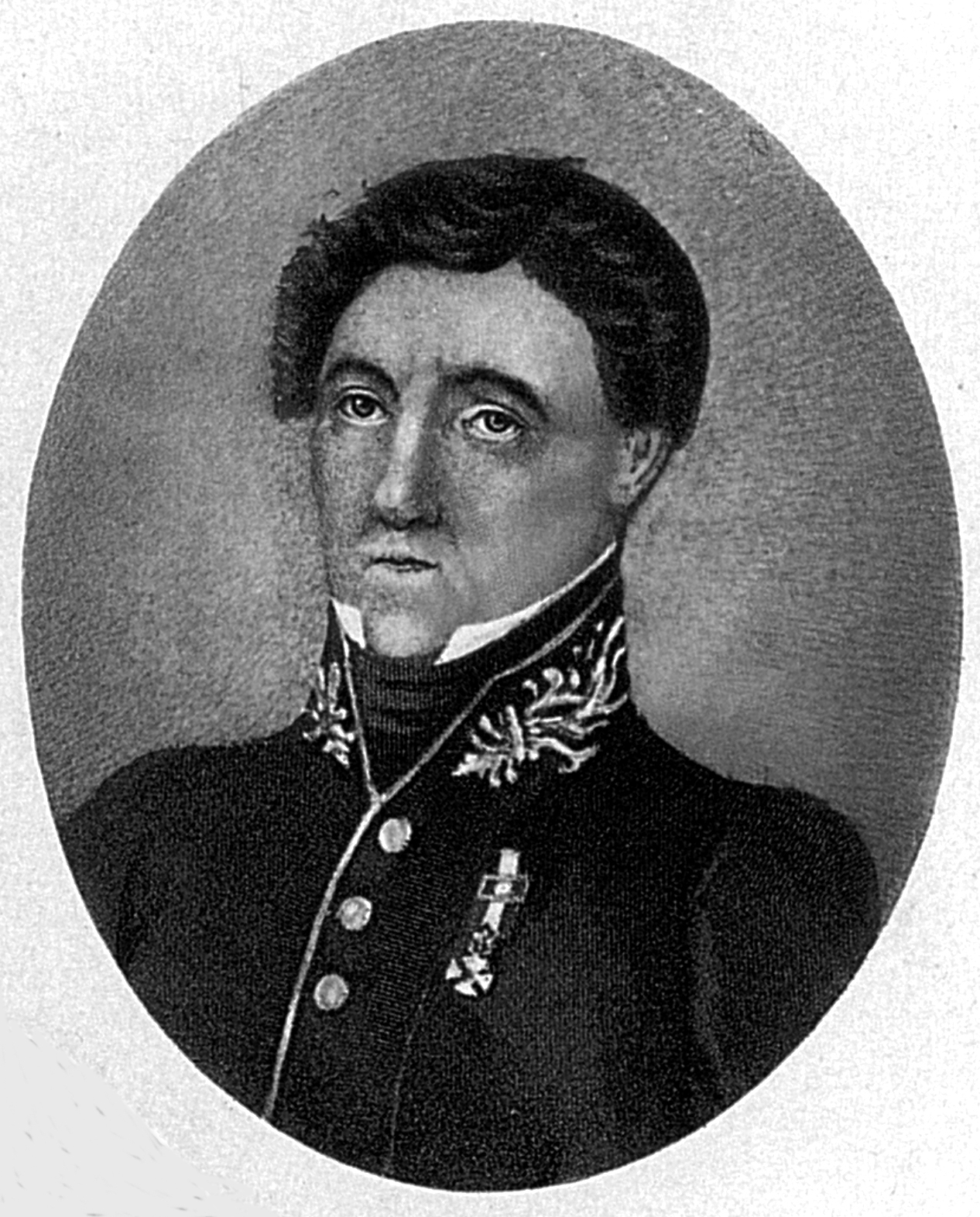
- Portrait of Francisco Cruzat

2ª Lieutenant Governors of Upper Louisiana
- In office 1775–1778
- Preceded by: Pedro Piernas
- Succeeded by: Fernando de Leyba

4ª Lieutenant Governors of Upper Louisiana
- In office September 24, 1780 – 1787
- Preceded by: Fernando de Leyba
- Succeeded by: Manuel Pérez

Personal details
- Born: March 10, 1739 Tafalla, Navarra, Spain
- Died: 1790 (aged 50–51) Pensacola, Florida
- Spouse(s): Doña Nicanora Ramos (also sometimes spelled Anicanora Ramos)
- Children: Antonio and José
- Profession: Soldier, Lieutenant Governor of Upper Louisiana and Interim Governor of Florida

Francisco Xavier Cruzat (also François Cruzat, Don Francisco Javier Cruzado Virto or Don Francisco Javier Cruzado Virto Y Ezpeleta) was a Spanish soldier who served as lieutenant governor of Upper Louisiana in New Spain (also known as the "lieutenant governor of St. Louis") from 1775 to 1778 and again from 1780 to 1787. He served as Interim Governor of East Florida in 1789.

== Biography ==
Francisco Cruzat was the son of Balthazar Cruzat (also Bernardo Baltazar Cruzado Y Ardanáz) and Francesca Cruzat (née: Francisca Ygnacia Virto Y Ezpeleta). He joined the Spanish Army in his youth and eventually became captain of grenadiers. In 1769, he moved to Louisiana (New Spain) with the newly appointed governor of Louisiana Alejandro O'Reilly. Cruzat arrived at St. Louis on May 20, 1775.

Cruzat became the lieutenant governor of Upper Louisiana in 1775. He continued the same enforcement of Spanish policies as his predecessor, Pedro Piernas. During his tenure the first ferry was established in Maramec, by a man named John Baptiste Gamache.

In 1778, Cruzat was removed from office on the orders of Louisiana Governor Bernardo Galvez, and was replaced by Fernando de Leyba.

In 1779, Cruzat took part in the conquest of Baton Rouge, and early 1780 he gained the rank of lieutenant colonel.

In September 1780, Francisco Cruzat was reappointed lieutenant governor of Upper Louisiana after the death of Fernando de Leyba in June earlier that year. Only a few months later in January 1781, Cruzat dispatched an attack on Fort St. Joseph near Lake Michigan in response to rumors of a spring attack on St. Louis by the British. His force was commanded by Captain Eugenio Pourré and included about 140 Spanish soldiers and 60 Native American volunteers. The militia also included Ensign Charles Tayon and the interpreter Louis Chevalier. Cruzat and his forces successfully captured Fort St. Joseph on February 12, 1781.

On November 27, 1787, Cruzat left his office as lieutenant governor of St. Louis and was succeeded by Manuel Pérez.

In 1789 he served as Interim Governor of East Florida, temporarily replacing an unwell Arturo O'Neill who had requested a leave of absence. O'Neill organized the Third Battalion of Pensacola in 1790, which Cruzat was assigned to command. He continued that assignment until he died.

== Personal life ==
Cruzat married Nicanora (also referred to as "Anicanora") Ramos, a native of Cartagena, Spain. They had four children together, Antonio, Francois, Josefa and José. There is little mention of Francois, and in Cruzat's first term as lieutenant governor of Upper Louisiana, his daughter Josefa died while still a young child and was buried in the church cemetery. Their two surviving sons were Antonio and José.

In May 1782, his wife and their two sons were captured by British allies near present-day Memphis, Tennessee while they were en route to St. Louis. Cruzat was able to negotiate their release for a ransom of 4500 pesos. His wife died in St. Louis in 1786, and Cruzat died in Pensacola, Florida in 1790.
