= Jean-Baptiste Benoit de Saint-Clair =

6th Commandants subordinate to Louisiana
- In office 1740–1742
- Preceded by: Alphonse de La Buissonnière
- Succeeded by: Claude de Bertet

8th Commandants subordinate to Louisiana
- In office 1749–1751
- Preceded by: Claude de Bertet
- Succeeded by: Barthélemy de Macarty Mactigue

Personal details
- Died: September 9, 1757 New Orleans
- Spouse: Marie-Louise Bienvenue
- Profession: Soldier and Administrator

Jean-Baptiste Benoit de Saint-Clair (? - died in September 9, 1757 in New Orleans), was an interim governor of Upper Louisiana who assumed this function twice after the non-consecutive deaths of two governors of the Upper Louisiana.

== Biography ==
Jean-Baptiste Benoit, Sieur de Saint-Clair, arrived in French Louisiana in 1717 as ensign.

In 1732, he was promoted to the rank of captain.

In 1740, he was appointed interim governor of the Country of the Illinois and commander of the Fort de Chartres due to the sudden death of the governor Alphonse de La Buissonnière. This interim ended in 1742 with the appointment of governor Claude de Bertet.

In 1749, following the death in combat of Governor Claude de Bertet during an attack against the Chickasaw Nation, he was recalled to succeed him as interim governor until the appointment of Governor Barthélemy de Macarty Mactigue in 1751.

He settled in the pioneer village of Kaskaskia, Illinois. In that place, he married in January 1750 with Marie-Louise Bienvenue, born in Kaskaskia in 1726 and daughter of Antoine Bienvenu, a major in the Franco-Louisianan defense militia who fought against the Native Americans, since they had carried out incursions and surprise attacks against the coureurs des bois and the trappers. Their godfather was Jean-Grégoire Volant, captain-commander of the Swiss Guard stationed in French Louisiana.

In 1752 he was called to Natchez, which was an important colonial center of French Louisiana and was located halfway between New Orleans and Saint-Louis.

Jean-Baptiste Benoit de Saint-Clair died in New Orleans on 9 September 1757.
