= Manuel Pérez (Lieutenant Governor of Upper Louisiana) =

Manuel Perez
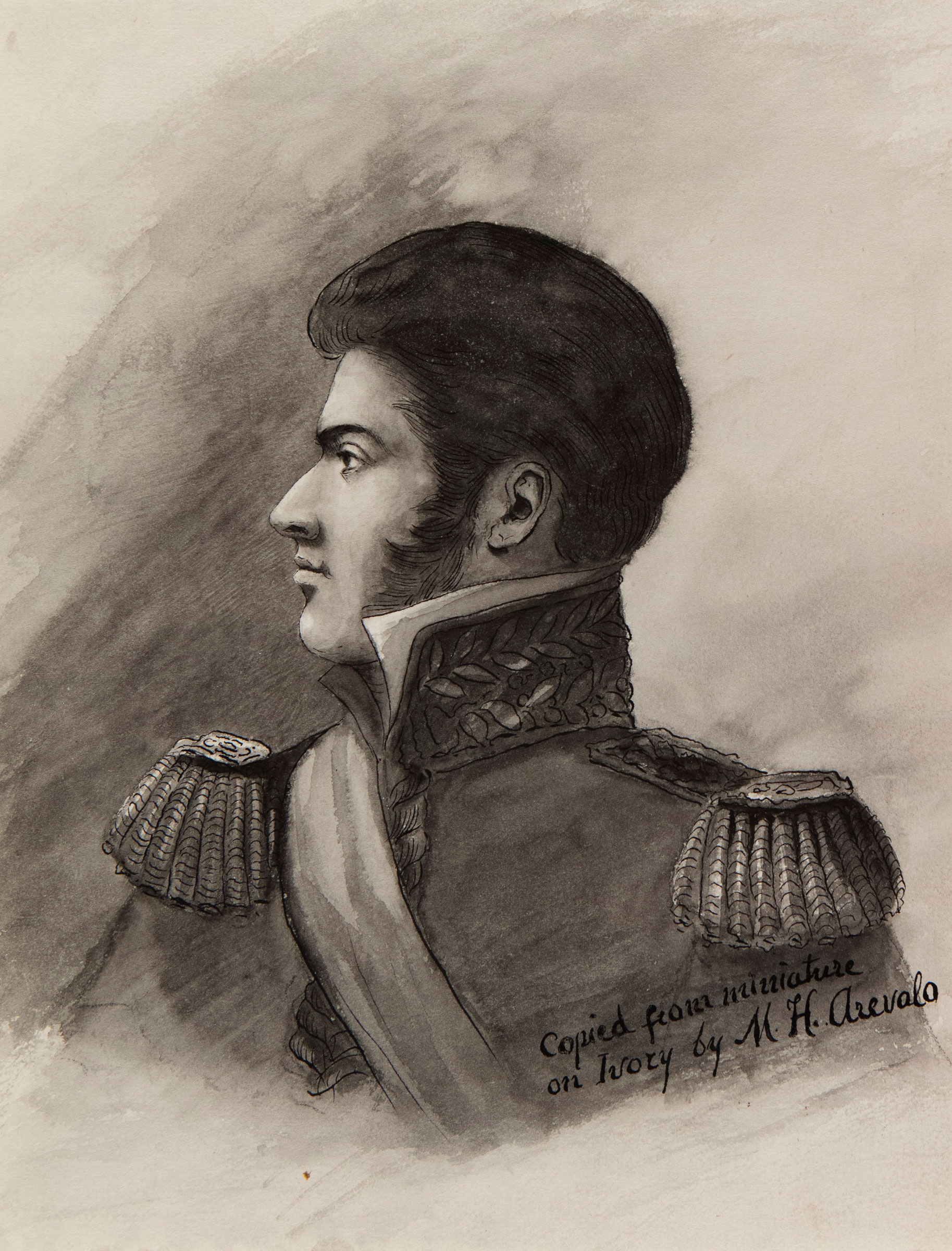
- Portrait of Manuel Pérez

5th Lieutenant Governor of Upper Louisiana
- In office 1787–1792
- Preceded by: Francisco Cruzat
- Succeeded by: Francisco Cruzat

Personal details
- Born: 1735 Zamora, Castile and León, Spain
- Died: November 1819 (aged 83–84) New Orleans, Louisiana
- Profession: Soldier, administrator (Lieutenant Governor of Illinois)

Manuel Perez (1735 - November 1819) was the lieutenant governor of Illinois between November 1787 and 1792.

== Biography ==
Pérez was born in Zamora, in the Autonomous Community of Castile and León, Spain. When he was only eighteen, he enrolled the army of his country. During his military career, he took part in the campaigns of both Spain and Portugal. In 1769, Pérez emigrated to New Orleans, where he took up permanent residence.

In 1779, Perez's army was sent to the British side of North America to help the rebels in their fight against the British in the American War of Independence. Perez's troops fought in Mobile and Pensacola. His military achievements allowed him to get the title of captain in 1780.

Later, in 1787, he was appointed Lieutenant-governor of Upper Louisiana, and assumed the charge in Saint Louis, the capital of Upper Louisiana, in modern-day Missouri. The highlight of his administration seems to have been his work on the fortifications of Upper Louisiana, which were quite deteriorated. He pushed for the reconstruction of a fort located in the north of Saint Louis, work for which he commissioned Rodríguez Miró, governor of Louisiana. He used stone for its reconstruction, but could not incorporate further improvements in it, because he did not get the necessary funding for that.

In addition, Perez had to face Osage tribes, who were attacking the European settlements of the province. To confront these, he asked for the construction of a fort between the French-Spanish settlements and the main Osage settlements. The fort would be built on the banks of the Osage River, but the New Orleans government opposed the proposal. Perez also helped trader Louis Lorimier promote the migration of members of the Shawnee and Lenape tribes, natives of eastern Mississippi, to Ste. Genevieve, in modern-day Missouri, to ignite good relations between the settlers and the Osages. He also asked the New Orleans government to establish several fortifications at the mouths of the Des Moines and Saint Peters Rivers in order to keep the British away from the Amerindians, whom they were influencing, but the government rejected the proposal because, according to him, the forts would be too far from Saint Louis, and instead would be near areas with little or no French-Spanish presence.

Perez, along with the Spanish authorities, encouraged U.S. migration to Upper Louisiana so that the new immigrants would populate areas of the province (which was largely uninhabited) and become subjects of the Spanish Crown. Thus, the population loyal to the Spanish Crown would be introduced into more areas of the province. The area chosen was called New Madrid by the European Americans, and was founded in what is now Missouri. However, although Perez himself welcomed them when they reached St. Louis in 1789, and provided them with various goods (provisions and horses) and guides, the American settlers were only living there for a while, as they then returned to their country.

Perez ended his rule in 1792. After this, he returned to New Orleans, where he held some low-level political positions and spent the last years of his life. He died there in November 1819.

== Personal life ==
In 1776, Perez married Jeanne Catherine Dubois and they had five children.
