= Louis Poncereau de Chavagne de Richebourg =

Louis Poncereau de Chavagne de Richebourg was an officer in the early French colony of Louisiana. He arrived there in 1713 and held the rank of captain in the Compagnies Franches de la Marine. He helped to found a new trading post and fort at Natchez, Mississippi in 1716, and fought in the first of a series of conflicts between the French and the Natchez people. He recorded his experiences in a manuscript entitled "Mémoire sur la première guerre des Natchez." He subsequently served in the French capture of Pensacola, Florida during the War of the Quadruple Alliance in 1719. According to the narrative by Dumont de Montigny, he was appointed to command a ship carrying Spanish prisoners to Havana, Cuba for ransom, only to be taken prisoner himself. Spanish forces then expropriated the vessel and returned to Pensacola, entering the harbor flying French colors and pretending to be under the command of Richebourg. After being ransomed from the Spanish at the end of the war, Richebourg was subsequently appointed royal lieutenant at the newly founded city of New Orleans in 1722, but sailed back to France that same year.
