= List of commandants of the Illinois Country =

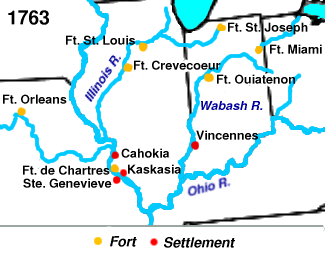
Key forts and settlements of Upper Louisiana during the French period

The Illinois Country was governed by military commandants for its entire period under French and British rule, and during its time as a county of Virginia. The presence of French military interests in the Illinois Country began in 1682 when Robert de La Salle built Fort St. Louis du Roche on the Illinois River. The commandant of the fort was the top French official in the region and was responsible to the Governor General of New France. In 1718 Illinois was transferred to Louisiana and renamed Upper Louisiana. The new seat of government was Fort de Chartres, located in what is now southeastern Illinois among the growing French settlements of Cahokia, Kaskaskia and Prairie du Rocher.

In 1763, at the conclusion of the French and Indian War, the entire area of Louisiana was divided, with Great Britain receiving the lands east of the Mississippi and Spain claiming the lands west of it. The new city of St. Louis, in present-day Missouri, became the seat of government of Spanish Upper Louisiana. The government of the British side, present-day Illinois, remained in the hands of military commandants at Fort de Chartres; upon that fort's abandonment the seat of government moved to Kaskaskia. British rule in Illinois was ad hoc and unsystematic. The Quebec Act of 1774 would have organized a government for the region, but before it could be put into effect Illinois was captured by Virginia militia in the Illinois Campaign.

After 1787 Illinois received a civil government as part of the Northwest and Indiana Territories before becoming a distinct Illinois Territory in 1809. The United States acquired the rest of Upper Louisiana in the Louisiana Purchase of 1803; military rule continued for a few months before it was transferred to civilian government, first under the Indiana Territory, and then as the Louisiana Territory in 1805.

== French period (1678–1763) ==
This period included the entire Mississippi River and Missouri River basin above the mouth of the Arkansas River.

=== Commandants subordinate to Canada ===
- Robert de La Salle (1678–1683)
- Henri de Tonti (1682–1683) interim
- Louis-Henri de Baugy, Chevalier de Baugy (1683–1685)
- Henri de Tonti (1685–1702)
- François Dauphin de la Forest (1700–1702)
- Pierre de Liette (1702–1718)

=== Commandants subordinate to Louisiana ===
- Pierre de Boisbriand (1718–1723)
- Claude Charles Du Tisné (1723–1725)
- Robert Groston de Saint-Ange (1730–1734)
- Pierre D'Artaguiette (1734–1736/7)
- Alphonse de La Buissonnière (1737–1740)
- Jean-Baptiste Benoit de Saint-Clair (1740–1742) interim
- Claude de Bertet (1742–1749)
- Jean-Baptiste Benoit de Saint-Clair (1749–1751), interim
- Barthélemy de Macarty Mactigue (1751–1760)
- Pierre-Joseph Neyon de Villiers (1760–1764)
- Louis Groston de Saint-Ange de Bellerive (1764–1770)

== East of the Mississippi ==
=== British period (1765–1778) ===
After the Seven Years' War ended in 1763, the Treaty of Paris awarded Great Britain the east bank of the Mississippi, from below Baton Rouge northwards. Due to the outbreak of Pontiac's War, British forces were unable to take control of the Illinois forts until 1765.

==== Commandants at Fort de Chartres ====
- Captain Sir Thomas Stirling, 5th Baronet (1765)
- Major Robert Farmer (1765–1766)
- Lieutenant-Colonel John Reed (1766–1768)
- Captain Forbes (acting) (1768)
- Lieutenant-Colonel John Wilkins (1768–1772)

==== Commandants at Fort Gage (Kaskaskia) ====
- Major Isaac Hamilton (acting) (1772)
- Captain Hugh Lord (1772–1774)
- Philippe-François de Rastel de Rocheblave (acting) (1774–1778)

=== Virginia period (1778–1787) ===
Virginia militia under George Rogers Clark captured Illinois in the Illinois Campaign of 1778. The territory was organized as Illinois County, Virginia and placed under a military government, which was intended to be temporary. This government came to an end in 1784, when Virginia ceded the Illinois Country to the United States government. It became part of the Northwest Territory in 1787.

==== County lieutenants & civil commandants of Illinois County ====
- John Todd (1778–1780)
- Timothy Demonbreun (?–1784) (remained in command at Kaskaskia until 1786)

== West of the Mississippi ==
=== Spanish period (1765–1803) ===
After 1765, when Western Louisiana was ceded to Spain by France, the provincial capitol of Upper Louisiana was St. Louis. In spite of that, the governors of Saint Louis maintained the name of "commandants of Illinois". During this period, Upper Louisiana referred only to the land west of the Mississippi River and above the mouth of the Arkansas River.

==== Commandants of Upper Louisiana ====
- Don Francisco Rui (1767–1768)
- Don Pedro Piernas (1768– ?)
- Louis Saint-Ange de Bellerive (? –1770)

==== Lieutenant-governors of Upper Louisiana ====
- Pedro Piernas (1770 – 1775)
- Francisco Cruzat (1775 – 1778)
- Captain Fernando de Leyba (1778 – June 28, 1780)
- Francisco Cruzat (September 24, 1780 – 1787)
- Manuel Pérez (November 1787 – 1792)
- Zénon Trudeau (1792 – 1799)
- Carlos de Hault de Lassus (1799 – 1804)

=== French Republic (1803) and District of Louisiana period (1804) ===
In 1803, France under Napoleon purchased Louisiana from Spain. France never established its rule in Upper Louisiana, and already in 1803 it sold the entire territory to the United States as the Louisiana Purchase. Jurisdiction was above the 33rd parallel on the west side of the Mississippi River. Nominal French control at St. Louis lasted only a single day, known as Three Flags Day, when sovereignty was symbolically transferred from Spain to France to the United States. American military rule continued for a few months. On October 1, 1804, civilian government began under the Governor of Indiana Territory. Upper Louisiana was reorganized as the Louisiana Territory in 1805 and the Missouri Territory in 1812.

==== Commandant of the District of Louisiana ====
- Amos Stoddard (1804)

== See also ==
- List of colonial governors of Louisiana
- List of governors of Illinois
- List of governors of Missouri
