= Fort Orleans =

18th-century frontier outpost in French North America

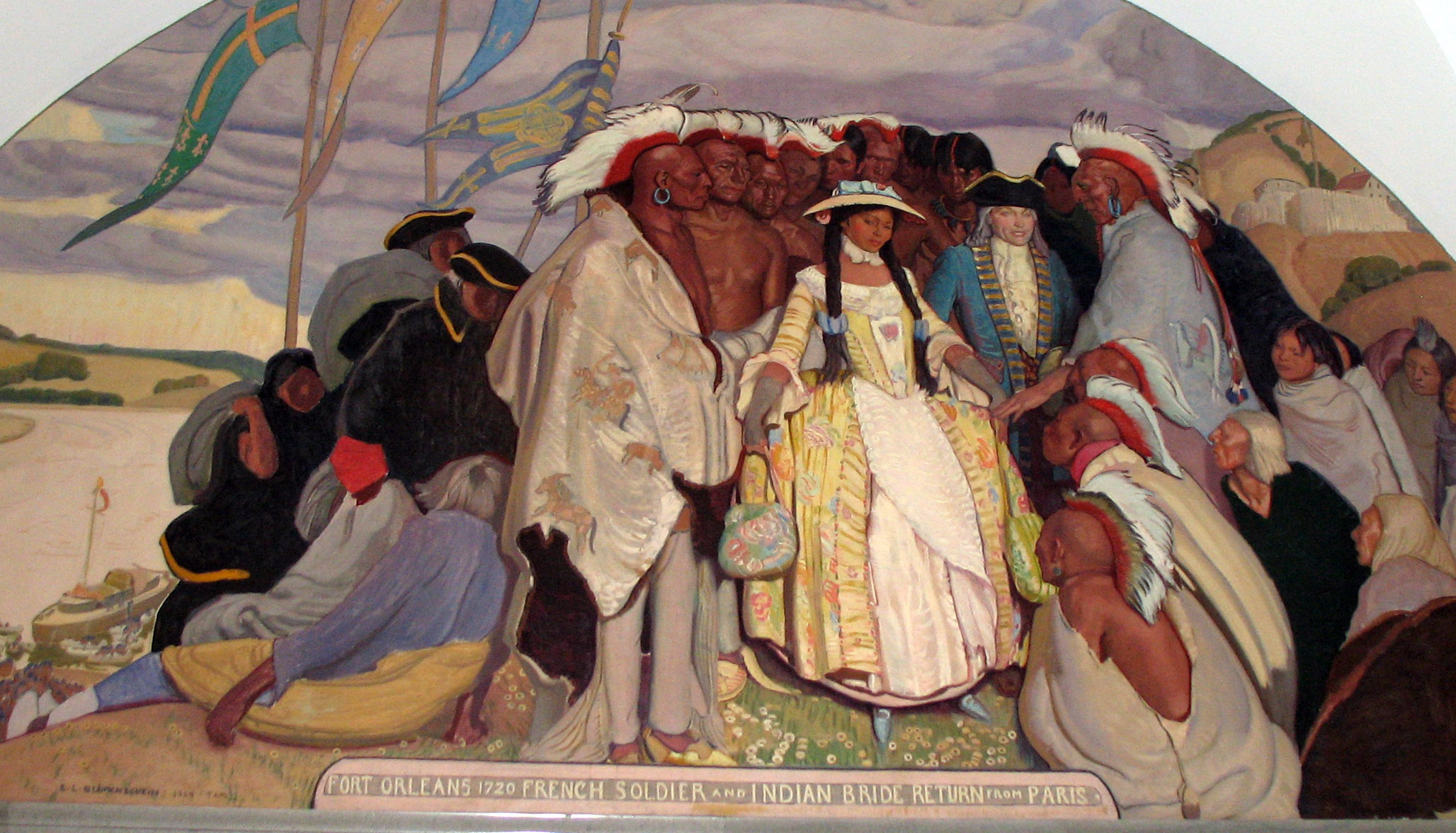
Return of the tribes to Fort Orleans from Paris depicted upon a mural in the Missouri State Capitol

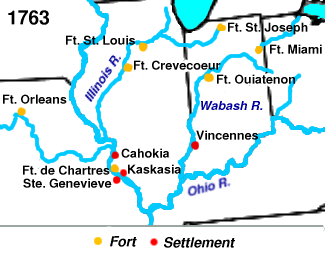
French settlements in 1763

Fort Orleans, sometimes referred to as Fort D'Orleans, was a French frontier outpost in colonial North America, and the first fort built by European forces on the Missouri River. It was reportedly located near the mouth of the Grand River near present-day Brunswick, Missouri. Intended to be the linchpin in the vast New France empire stretching from Montreal to New Mexico, the fort was occupied from 1723 to 1726. It was the first multi-year European settlement in what is today the U.S. state of Missouri.

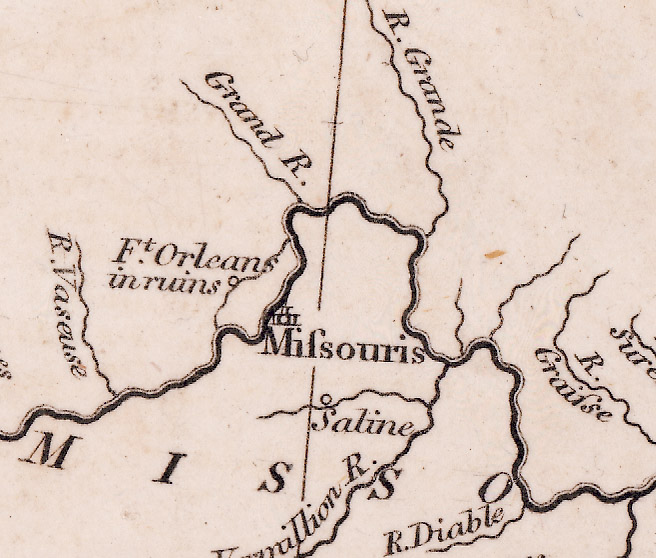
Fort Orleans site, as noted on John Cary's 1805 map

== History ==
The fort was established on the Missouri River in 1723 by Étienne de Veniard, Sieur de Bourgmont. It was to be the Missouri River headquarters of the newly claimed French Louisiana territory. Like the newly founded New Orleans, Louisiana, it was named for the Duke of Orléans.

De Bourgmont had commanded the French fort at Fort Detroit. In 1706 he and other soldiers deserted when criticized by Antoine Laumet de La Mothe, sieur de Cadillac for his handling of a skirmish with attacking Ottawa Indians. A French priest and soldier were killed by the Indians, and the French killed 30 Ottawa tribesmen.

While on the lam from French authorities, de Bourgmont lived with the Native Americans and explored the lower Missouri. He often traded in furs, although not authorized to do so. Catholic missionaries urged that he be arrested for indecency because of traveling with his Missouri wife and their children of mixed European and Native American ancestry. His base was the Missouri tribal village near where Fort Orleans was to be established.

In 1713 de Bourgmont wrote Exact Description of Louisiana, of Its Harbors, Lands and Rivers, and Names of the Indian Tribes That Occupy It, and the Commerce and Advantages to Be Derived Therefrom for the Establishment of a Colony. In 1714, he published an account detailing his travels to the mouth of the Platte River, entitled The Route to Be Taken to Ascend the Missouri River. His descriptions and names of rivers, based on names of local tribes, were used by cartographer Guillaume Delisle for the first map of the region. Delisle used "Missouri" for the river rather than Pekitanoui, as the explorers Louis Jolliet and Jacques Marquette had named it after they first viewed it in 1673.

In 1718 Jean-Baptiste Le Moyne de Bienville, founder of the Louisiana territory, said that instead of arresting Bourgmont, they should work with him. He recommended that Bourgmont receive the Cross of Saint Louis for service to France.

In 1720 Bourgmont and his son, along with a chief, traveled to France, where they were greeted as national heroes. His reputation was enhanced as news arrived that the Pawnee (who had been friendly with Bourgmont) had slaughtered the Villasur expedition near modern-day Columbus, Nebraska. This stopped the Spanish from establishing settlements in the Missouri River Valley.

Stock for the Mississippi Company rose in price based on forecasts of great riches in Louisiana. Bourgmont was promised a title of nobility if he could build a fort and strike an alliance with the Native Americans to keep the Spanish out of the Missouri valley. Bourgmont stayed in Normandy for a time and married a woman in his hometown in 1721.

In 1722 he returned to New Orleans but was too sick to proceed on an expedition. In the meantime, funds in the Mississippi Company collapsed. He argued with his sponsors over whether a fort was necessary; he thought it more important to recruit Native Americans in alliances to unite to fight the Spanish, as he believed his mission had not changed. As ordered, he established the fort on November 9, 1723, to be garrisoned with 40 French soldiers.

In 1724, de Bourgmont traveled up the Missouri River to the Kaw village near Doniphan, Kansas, with the objective of establishing friendly relations among the Indian tribes of the region and seeking a trade route to the Spanish colony of Nuevo México. With a delegation of Indians from several tribes, he then ventured westward onto the Great Plains to visit their common enemy, the Padouca tribe, near Lyons, Kansas.

Bourgmont participated in a peace ceremony between the Padouca and the Missouri, Osage, Iowa, Pawnee, Oto, Kaw, and Omaha, wherein a ceremonial pipe was smoked to seal the agreement. The Indians whom Bourgmont called Padouca are believed by some to have been the people later known as Comanche but were more likely Apache. This was the first recorded French visit to them.

In celebration, in 1725 Bourgmont escorted the chiefs of the tribes to Paris to show them the "glory of France", including the palaces at Château de Marly, Fontainebleau and Versailles; and to hunt on the royal preserve with Louis XV. Bourgmont returned to his home in Normandy and did not accompany the chiefs back to Missouri. He abandoned his Missouri wife and children.

The French abandoned Fort Orleans in 1726. One story says that when the garrison had been reduced to a contingent of eight soldiers, Native Americans attacked and burned it, killing all the troops. Another story says it was merely abandoned.

On November 29, 1729, Natchez Indians attacked French settlements near present-day Natchez, Mississippi, killing more than 200 French colonists. Less than one year later, on September 9, 1730, a French army of 1,400 soldiers and its Indian allies massacred about 500 Fox Indians (including 300 women and children) as they tried to flee their besieged camp.

== Possible locations ==
Archaeologists have not found evidence of Fort Orleans despite some promising starts, particularly south of the Missouri River. Lewis and Clark visited the area in June 1804 to seek the fort, but reported they found no trace of it.

Three possible locations for the fort are:

- Near Malta Bend, Missouri in Saline County, on the south side of the Missouri River. Archeological discoveries in what is now Van Meter State Park in the area known as "the Pinnacles" appear to support this. Included within the park is an unrelated earthwork fort, which archeologists believe is of Native American and not French origin. 39.2748°N 93.2612°W
- On the north bank of the Missouri River near the mouth of Wakenda Creek in Carroll County (based on Bourgmont's description of the Missouri village). 39.33159°N 93.22275°W
- An island in the Missouri River between the two (based on a drawing about 1748 of the plans for the fort).
