= Calvary Cemetery (St. Louis) =

Roman Catholic cemetery located in St. Louis, Missouri

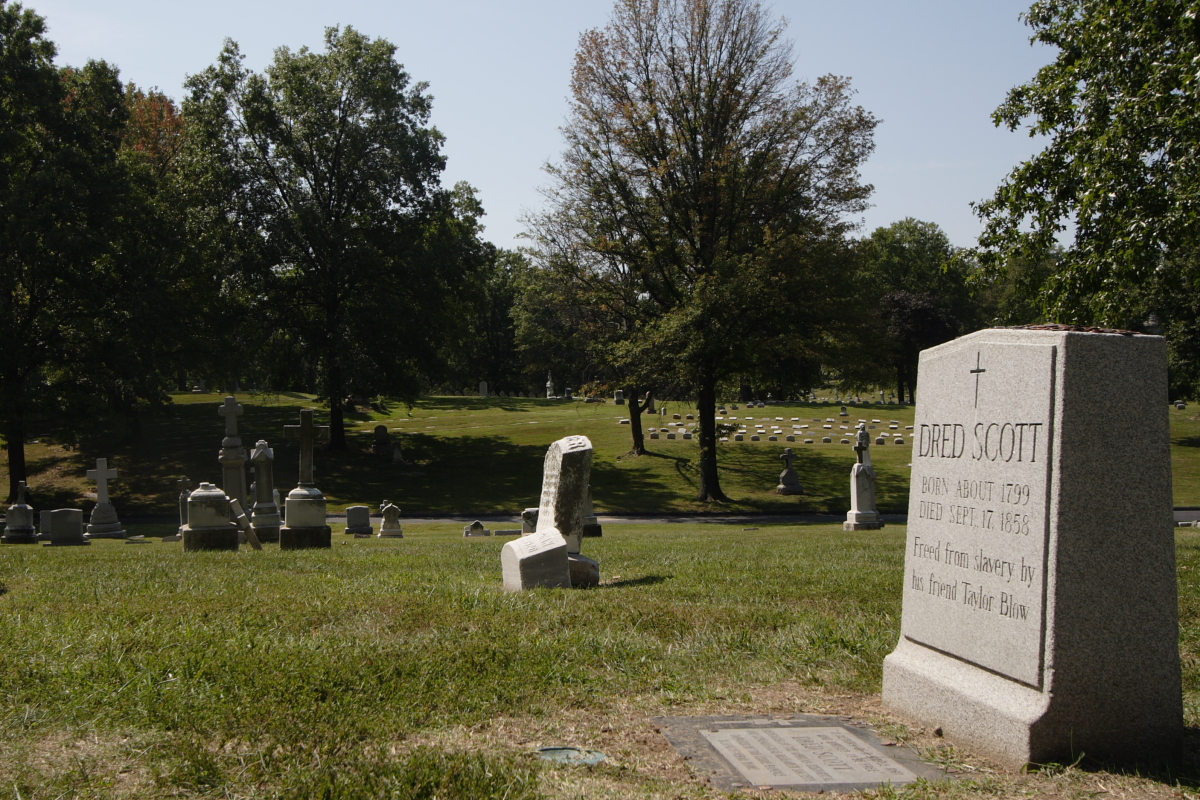
- Dred Scott's grave in Calvary Cemetery
- Interactive map of Calvary Cemetery

Details
- Established: 1854
- Location: 5239 West Florissant Avenue; St. Louis, Missouri
- Country: United States of America
- Coordinates: 38.69502°N 90.238244°W
- Type: Catholic
- Owned by: Roman Catholic Archdiocese of St. Louis
- Size: 470 acres (190 ha)
- No. of graves: 300,000
- Website: Calvary Cemetery
- Find a Grave: Calvary Cemetery

Calvary Cemetery is a Catholic cemetery in St. Louis, Missouri, operated by the Archdiocese of St. Louis. Founded in 1854, it is the second oldest cemetery in the archdiocese. The cemetery contains 470 acres (1.9 km^{2}) of land and more than 300,000 graves, including those of General William Tecumseh Sherman, Dred Scott, Tennessee Williams, Kate Chopin, Louis Chauvin and Auguste Chouteau.

== History ==
In 1849 a cholera epidemic struck St. Louis and claimed the lives of more than 4,000 people. This disaster prompted city officials to pass an ordinance banning the creation of new cemeteries within city limits, as it was thought that such a measure could prevent additional people from becoming sick. At the same time, existing cemeteries in St. Louis were nearly full and had no room to expand.

Recognizing the need for a new rural cemetery, Archbishop Peter Richard Kenrick purchased Senator Henry Clay’s “Old Orchard Farm” in 1853, located several miles northwest of St. Louis. Kenrick initially set aside the eastern half of the 323-acre farm for a new cemetery, and kept the western half for himself, where he lived for many years in the former Clay Mansion. Calvary Cemetery opened for burials in 1854, with Archbishop Kenrick as its first president.

Prior to the establishment of Calvary Cemetery, parts of the Clay farm had served as a burial place for Native Americans and soldiers from nearby Fort Bellefontaine. After 1854, these remains were reinterred in a mass grave under a large crucifix at one of the highest points in the cemetery. Graves at other Catholic cemeteries across St. Louis, such as Old Cathedral, Rock Springs, Holy Trinity, Old St. Patrick's, New Bremen and others were also dug up and reinterred at Calvary. As the number of graves steadily grew, the cemetery acquired more land, eventually reaching its present-day size of 470 acres. It has more than 300,000 casketed graves, and two public mausoleums and columbaria, as well as a number of private family mausoleums and sarcophagi.

Space for full-casket traditional burials is available for the next 300 years at Calvary Cemetery, according to archdiocesan sources. Many former St. Louisans choose to be returned to Calvary for burial, including August Chouteau X, a great-great-great-grandson of the city's founder, who lived most of his life in Los Angeles, California. The brother of noted writer and dramatist Tennessee Williams chose to have him buried here, bringing his body from New York City where he had died.

In 2003, a Lewis and Clark Bicentennial Grant funded the construction of a monument at Calvary Cemetery to honor four Nez Perce men who had traveled to St. Louis in 1831 from their home in present-day Idaho. When they arrived in St. Louis, these men had to rely on hand gestures to communicate, as they could find no one who spoke their language. Two of the men, Black Eagle and Speaking Eagle, died of illness while in St. Louis and are buried in Calvary Cemetery.

== Notable Calvary burials ==
- Louis Auguste Benoist (1803–1867), pioneer banker and financier who helped develop St. Louis
- Mary Odilia Berger (1823–1880), founder of the Franciscan Sisters of Mary, which operates hospitals in Midwest
- Thomas Biddle (1790–1831), military hero during the War of 1812; killed in a duel with Missouri Congressman Spencer Pettis on Bloody Island in the Mississippi River
- Lewis V. Bogy (1813–1877), United States Senator (1873–1877) and founder of the St. Louis Iron Mountain Railway
- Martin Stanislaus Brennan (1845–1927), Catholic priest, scientist, and author
- Patrick E. Burke (c. 1830–1864), Missouri state legislator and colonel in the Union Army during the American Civil War
- Thomas Ambrose Butler (1837–1897), Irish-American priest and poet
- Mickey Carroll (1919–2009), a "munchkin" in the 1939 film The Wizard of Oz
- Philando Castile (1983–2016), victim of a high-profile police shooting in Minnesota
- Alfonso J. Cervantes (1920–1983), mayor of St. Louis (1965–1973)
- Louis Chauvin (1881–1908), ragtime musician
- Kate Chopin (1851–1904), author of popular short stories and novels
- Oscar Chopin (1873–1932), newspaper cartoonist
- François Chouteau (1797–1838), fur trader and businessman, founder of Kansas City, Missouri
- René Auguste Chouteau (1740–1829), fur trader, co-founder of the city of St. Louis
- Powhatan Henry Clarke (1862–1893), United States Army First Lieutenant and Medal of Honor recipient
- William Mordecai Cooke Sr. (1823–1863), member of the Provision Confederate Congress and First Confederate Congress from Missouri
- Pierre-Jean De Smet (1801–1873), Belgian Jesuit priest and missionary to the Native Americans
- Thomas Anthony Dooley III (1927–1961), physician and humanitarian
- Charles and Ray Eames, designers and architects
- James Brailsford Erwin (1856–1924), brigadier general in the US Army
- Daniel M. Frost (1823–1900), brigadier general in the Confederate States Army
- Anthony Giordano (1915–1980), boss of the St. Louis crime family
- Charles Gratiot (1786–1855), chief engineer of the United States Army Corps of Engineers
- Robert E. Hannegan (1903–1949), United States postmaster general and commissioner of Internal Revenue
- Martin Wilkes Heron (1850–1920), bartender and mixologist, creator of the liqueur known as Southern Comfort
- John Joseph Kain (1841–1903), archbishop of St. Louis
- Ted Kennedy (1865–1907), inventor of the baseball catcher's mitt, a baseball pitcher, and a sporting goods manufacturer, in Baseball Hall of Fame.
- Peter Richard Kenrick (1806–1896), first archbishop west of the Mississippi River
- Charles Lucas (1792–1817), entrepreneur and legislator in the Missouri Territory; killed in a duel with U.S. Senator Thomas Hart Benton on Bloody Island
- John Baptiste Charles Lucas (1758–1842), U.S. Representative who donated land for the Old Courthouse in St. Louis
- Alexander McNair (1775–1826), first governor of the State of Missouri (1820–1824)
- Eduard Miloslavic (1884-1952), forensic pathologist and one of the investigators into the Katyn Massacre.
- Virginia Sarpy Peugnet (1827–1917), one of the three original grand dames of St. Louis
- James T. Rapier (1837–1883), one of Alabama's three black congressmen during the Reconstruction Era

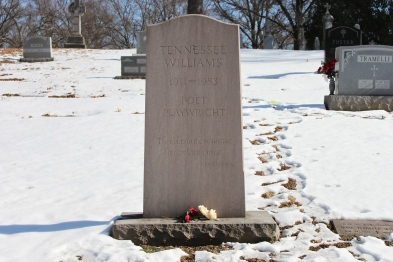
Tennessee Williams' grave

- Thomas C. Reynolds (1821–1887), Confederate governor of Missouri from 1862 to 1865
- Phyllis Schlafly (1924–2016), conservative author known for leading the opposition to the Equal Rights Amendment
- Dred Scott (1799–1858), slave who sued for freedom, resulting in the landmark U.S. Supreme Court decision, Dred Scott v. Sandford
- Ellen Ewing Sherman (1824–1888), wife of William Tecumseh Sherman
- William Tecumseh Sherman (1820–1891), Union Army major general, noted for his "March to the Sea" campaign through Georgia during the American Civil War.
- Antoine Soulard (1766–1825), last surveyor general of Upper Louisiana for the Spanish Empire
- Marie Julia Cérre Soulard (1775–1845) landowner who donated land for the Soulard Farmers Market in St. Louis
- Raymond Tucker (1896–1970), mayor of St. Louis (1953–1965)
- John Wesley Turner (1833–1899), Union Army brigadier general during the American Civil War
- John Vitale (1909–1982), Cosa Nostra boss in St. Louis
- James Wall (1863–1927), comedian and minstrel
- Tennessee Williams (1911–1983), Pulitzer Prize-winning playwright
- Juanita "Sapphire" Wright (1934-1996), professional wrestling character
- St. Louis Jane Doe (?–1983), an unidentified child who was found murdered in an abandoned house. She is buried in the Garden of Innocents, a section of the cemetery designated for unidentified decedents

== See also ==
- List of United States cemeteries
- Bellefontaine Cemetery
