= Colorado crime family =

Italian-American organized crime syndicate

- Founded: c. 1930s
- Founder: Carlino Brothers (BH); Giuseppe Roma (LCN)
- Founding location: Denver and Pueblo, Colorado, United States
- Years active: c. 1920s–2000s
- Territory: Primarily the Denver metropolitan area and Pueblo County, with additional territory throughout Colorado, as well as Las Vegas
- Ethnicity: Italians as "made men" and other ethnicities as associates
- Activities: Racketeering, bootlegging, loansharking, extortion, drug trafficking, and illegal gambling
- Allies: Bonanno crime family; Chicago Outfit; Kansas City crime family; Los Angeles crime family; New Orleans crime family; St. Louis crime family
- Rivals: Various gangs in Colorado

The Colorado crime family, also known as the Smaldone crime family, the Denver crime family, the Arvada Cop Mafia, the Denver Mafia or the Mountain Mafia, was an Italian-American Mafia crime family based in Pueblo and Denver, Colorado. The family originated as a bootlegging organization headed by the brothers Pete and Sam Carlino, which was later taken over by Giuseppe "Little Caesar" Roma. Roma's organization evolved into the Denver branch of La Cosa Nostra, which became known as the Smaldone crime family. Roma expanded the family's criminal operations into extortion, loan sharking, drugs, bookmaking, and other rackets. It is believed by federal authorities that the Denver Mafia went defunct in the 2000s after the death of Clarence Smaldone.

== History ==
=== Carlino brothers ===
Pete and Sam Carlino were prominent figures in southern Colorado's bootlegging scene during the early 20th century. Operating from 1922 to 1931, the Carlino brothers established a significant presence in the bootlegging territories south of Denver. As their influence grew, they expanded their operations to Denver, with ambitions to control the entire liquor trade in Colorado.

In an attempt to prevent an escalation of conflicts among various bootlegging factions, Giuseppe "Joe" Roma, a Denver bootlegger, organized a "Bootleggers Convention" on January 25, 1931. This gathering aimed to find a resolution and prevent a full-scale war between the Carlino brothers and other bootleggers. However, the convention was interrupted by law enforcement, resulting in the arrest of 29 attendees, most of whom had prior criminal records.

While Pete Carlino and others were taken into custody, they were eventually released. Notably, Giuseppe Roma, a key figure in organizing the convention, was not present at the meeting. This event drew attention to District Attorney Carr, who faced public criticism for his perceived lack of action in prosecuting the bootleggers, a sentiment that was further exacerbated by Mayor Stapleton's response to the situation.

On March 17, 1931, Pete Carlino's opulent home at 3357 Federal Boulevard exploded. Initially, police suspected it was members of rival gangs who had set the blast. Federal undercover agent Lawrence Baldesareli informed police that it had been Pete Carlino himself who had planned the arson, in order to collect the insurance money for the blast. His empire was flagging and he was quickly running out of money. Joe Petralia, Chris Murkuri, and Carlino's cousin Dan Colletti were convicted for setting the blast.

On May 8, 1931, Sam Carlino was killed in his home by Bruno Mauro. Carlino's cousin James Colletti was wounded in the attack but survived. Sam Carlino's wife and Colletti initially informed police that Mauro was the shooter. When the trial approached, Colletti had fled the area and Mrs. Carlino refused to testify in court against Mauro for fear of her family's lives.

After his brother's assassination, Pete Carlino went into hiding. According to police testimony on an unrelated matter, Lucille Crupi claimed that she met Carlino while in Milwaukee in early June 1931. She claimed that he was dropping off a shipment of booze and was picking up another load to return to Colorado. On June 19, 1931, Carlino was captured hiding in his cousin's farmhouse outside Pueblo. On June 25, 1931, Joe Roma posted Pete Carlino's $5,000 bond, using his house as collateral. Contrary to popular belief, Roma and Carlino were not enemies; rather, they had a working relationship that spanned over eight years.

On September 10, 1931, Pete Carlino was killed, shot twice in the back and once in the head at close range. He was on his way to visit Joe Petralia at the prison in Cañon City. Carlino's body was placed under the Siloam Road bridge just outside Pueblo. After two days, the body had not been discovered, so the killers returned and dragged it onto the road. An anonymous phone call made to Carlino's wife informed her where the body could be found. This ended the Carlinos's reign of control of the Colorado bootlegging era.

=== Joseph Roma ===
Giuseppe Roma became Joseph Roma. In the prohibition era from 1920 to 1933, crime families formed all over the country to profit from bootlegging. Operating from his grocery store as a front business, Roma became the de facto boss of criminal activity in Denver. Roma died on February 18, 1933 after being shot with fourteen bullets while playing the mandolin in his home.

=== Smaldone Brothers ===
The three brothers, Eugene, Clyde, and Clarence owned and operated Gaetano's Italian restaurant, a popular spot in North Denver, for years. The rise of the family began in 1933 after crime boss bootlegger, Joe Roma, was found riddled with seven bullets in the front parlor of his North Denver home. Six of the shots were to Roma's head. His wife, Nettie, found him slumped in his favorite overstuffed chair. The Smaldone's were questioned but not charged.

==== Clyde Smaldone ====
Clyde was born in 1906; his lengthy criminal record began with a burglary charge in 1920. He served 18 months in Leavenworth for bootlegging in 1933. Three years later he served time for the attempted bombing murder of a local man named Leon Barnes. Paroled in 1949, he confessed to paying protection money for his Central City gambling enterprises.

In 1953, Clyde and Eugene made headlines after a publicized raid of one of their gambling dens in Brighton, Colorado. Later that year both brothers were found guilty of jury tampering, fined $24,000 each, and sentenced to 60 years in prison. After spending 13 months in jail, the brothers received a new trial. Clyde pleaded guilty to a lesser tampering charge and was sentenced to 12 years and fined $10,000. He was paroled in 1962. In 1967, Clyde and several others, including Eugene's son, were arrested on gambling charges and for running a $100,000-a-week bookmaking operation.

Clyde died at The Cedars Nursing Home at the age of 91, in January 1998. His son told reporters that despite his father's criminal past, he had a soft side and donated to local orphanages, churches, and schools.

==== Eugene Smaldone ====
Eugene was recognized as Northern Colorado's leading crime figure and described as the patriarch of the Denver Crime Family. Although suspected of taking part in several killings, Eugene was never indicted for murder. Eugene's arrest record showed entries for auto theft, bootlegging, and income tax evasion. A local law official described Eugene as, "...the schoolteacher type. He wore glasses. Very polite. Very civil." His final prison sentence was in 1983. The charges were for operating a loan shark business out of Gaetano's. Eugene along with Clarence, and a nephew, Paul Clyde "Fat Paulie" Villano, pleaded guilty to the charges which also included illegal gun possession. Eugene Smaldone died in March 1992 of a heart attack at the age of 81. After Eugene's funeral, a relative wrote to the Denver newspapers complaining of the pain the media had caused the family and pleaded to be left alone.

Beginning in 1973 or earlier, the Colorado family partnered with the St. Louis crime family in skimming profits from the Riviera hotel and casino in Las Vegas. Anthony Giordano, the boss of the St. Louis family, held ultimate control over the Colorado family.

==== Clarence "Chauncey" Smaldone ====
Clarence Smaldone was considered the underboss of a two-member mob family. On August 10, 1971, he was acquitted of federal loansharking charges. Clarence served eight years in a Fort Worth prison hospital for the 1983 loan sharking conviction. He was released in 1991.

By 1990, the Colorado family consisted of a single "made" member, according to the FBI.

Clarence Smaldone died of natural causes on October 16, 2006, at the age of 82.

=== Current status ===
Following the death of Clarence Smaldone, the last surviving Smaldone brother, in 2006, Dick Kreck of The Denver Post wrote "After 60 years and the death of Chauncey Smaldone, the Smaldone family is no longer organized crime".

== Historical leadership ==
=== Boss ===
- 1928–1931 – Pete Carlino
- 1931–1933 – Joe "Little Caesar" Roma
- 1933–1950 – Charles Blanda
- 1950–1969 – Vincenzo Colletti
- 1969–1975 – Joseph "Scotty" Spinuzzi
- 1975–1992 – Eugene "Checkers" Smaldone
- 1992–2006 – Clarence "Chauncey" Smaldone

== Former members and associates ==
- Joseph Paul "Joe" Nuoci (born on January 16, 1942) – former associate and cooperator. Nuoci was born in Adams County, and his family hailed from Insernia and Abruzzo. Nuoci first became associated with the Colorado family by 1963 at the latest. Nuoci was a registered bartender during the early 1960s, and was arrested for illegal gambling in August 1964 after the Denver Police Department had raided a gambling den located on 1019 Social Club at 1019 on East Colfax Avenue, among the arrested were Robert "Bobby the Pig" Woolverton, Philip "Fat Phil" Tolvo, Jesse Bridwell, Robert Quintana, Michael Eugene Pauldino, Charles "Chuck" Perito, Dennis Valley and Richard Lamirato. In October 1964, Nuoci was arrested by the IRS for failing to notify them on an address change while engaging in wagering activities authorised by federal tax stamps, Nuoci had failed to notify law enforcement regarding the move to a residence at 7071 Warren Drive, and was released on $1500 bond. In December 1964, he was arrested for operating an illegal gambling den located on 300 Cortez Street, Western Hills, and avoided a prison sentence. In January 1965, he a paid a fine of $20 for speeding. In January 1966, he was indicted among several others, including Clarence Smaldone, Paul Clyde Villano, Peter Mazone, Michael Pauldino, Antonio Ciccarelli, Louis "Cal" Brindisi, Phil Tolvo and Robert Quintana, during an illegal gambling raid. By 1967, Nuoci was heavily involved in burglary, loansharking and illegal gambling. In January 1968, Joe Salardino began serving an 180 day jail sentence for illegal gambling charges, and was given responsibility to collect loanshark and illegal gambling monies on behalf of Joe Salardino, the consigliere of the family at the time. In February 1968, Nuoci and Herbet Chee robbed the Simeone family located on 3375 Zephyr Court in Wheat Ridge, and stole cash, bonds, furs and jewellery, he was arrested in Los Angeles and released on $100,000 bond. In March 1969, he was arrested for during an illegal gambling raid by the Denver Police Department Vice Squad located on 3292 Sheridan Boulevard, the Denver Police seized around $1400 in cash, gambling supplies and a handgun, and by the end of 1969, he was indicted and convicted of interstate federal violations in connection to the transportation and sale of stolen securities in Los Angeles. In April 1970, he was shot and wounded after an argument between Joe Salardino and Eugene Smaldone, Nuoci had met with Salardino and Smaldone and both men accused Nuoci of owing $10,000 and a diamond ring, several days after the meeting and following the shooting, he began cooperating. He died in November 2006.
- Phillip "Phil" Baccarella (born on June 25, 1917) – former associate. Baccarella was born in Rockvale, Fremont County, and his family hailed from Trapani and Agrigento. In April 1935, Baccarella lived in Raton, New Mexico. In October 1940, he may have had lived in Westcliffe, Custer County, and lived in Lincoln County, Nevada by 1943. Baccarella married Teresa Giroux in February 1943. It is believed he first became associated with the Colorado family by at least the late 1940s and heavily active in illegal gambling. In 1950, Baccarella was a registered pool manager in the area of Fremont County. In March 1950, Baccarella had his business raided, Phil's Cafe in Florence, by Cañon City District Attorney John S. Witcher and his men, during an operation targeting illegal gambling dens, he was released on $500 bond. In April 1954, he was fined $15 after he pled guilty to careless driving. In August 1957, he was arrested on illegal gambling charges after he was pulled over by police, along with Michael Pauldino and Ted Louis Canino. He died in November 1990.
- Nicolo "Nick" Bisulco (born on September 24, 1895) – former associate. Bisulco arrived in New York onboard the ship Tartar Prince in October 1898 and relocated to Colorado. In January 1920, Bisulco married Mary Zueck in Aguilar, Colorado. By 1920, Bisulco resided in Weld County and was a registered brewery manager, and around this time, he was heavily involved in bootlegging. In September 1926, Bisulco operated the Apishapa Trading Company along with R. Bowen Daniel and Giuseppe "Joe" Machetta, the Apishapa Trading company dealt in farming provisions, and the business-warehouse was destroyed in a fire in August 1927. By 1930, Bisulco lived in Delagua, Las Animas County and was a registered meat cutter at a general store, and around this time, he was associated with Nick Bisulco, John Charles Cha, Robert Joseph Dionisio, Italico "Tal" Micheliza, John Boccaccio and Salvatore "Sam" Brocato. In 1936, Bisulco operated the Ideal Cash Carry Meat Market located on 166 East Main Street in Trinidad until 1941, which was owned by Jesse Louis Gerardi, Bisulco opened the Bisulco Market deli with brother located on 333 West Main in Trinidad. In January 1941, Bisulco was appointed by as Animas County Judge W. T. Eckhart to serve as the county clerk, and may have resigned in around 1950. He died in December 1975.
- John Rankin "Skip" LaGuardia (born on March 19 or 21, 1943) – former associate. LaGuardia was born in Denver, and his family hailed from Basilicata, his father had a law degree from Westminster Law School, and during WW2, he served as investigator in the Army Criminal Investigation Division in Italy and in other European countries, shortly before his death in May 1951, he had served as an assistant to Colorado attorney general, John Metzger, and was also an enforcement agent for the state's Office of Price Stabilisation. LaGuardia attended the Mount Carmel High School, and in April 1961, he had signed for enrolment at the Colorado University. In June 1961, LaGuardia played for the Denver All-Stars as a fullback, guard for Colorado University in October 1961, and left-tackle for Colorado University in October 1962, replacing Dan Grimm due to his injury. In November 1963, LaGuardia was fined $50 after his arrest for illegal gambling, and quit his American-football career, however he became a coach for a baseball team. In 1964, he married Patricia Wahl. In October 1968, LaGuardia filed a police report in relation to a restaurant he had operated, the Alpine Inn located on 3551 Tejon Street, was robbed and the thieves sold liquor supplies totalling around $1,000 dollars, and in November 1968, he had paid around $2500 for repairs at the Alpine Inn, likely the damages were caused by the thieves at the break-in. In February 1970, he paid for a home in Lakewood located on 11162 W. 27th Place. In February 1971, LaGuardia and Don DeLuzio was arrested for extortion and obstruction of justice in relation to illegal gambling debts owed by William "Tony" Durbano, a confidential trial witness, among the arrested were Don DeLuzio, Richard "Dick" Benallo and Stanley Lamirato, LaGuardia was released on $25,000 bond, he was acquitted in June 1971 for the February charges. In March 1971, he was indicted for illegal gambling violations, perjury and burglary, he pled guilty to illegal gambling charges and was given a 3 month suspended sentence. In 1971, LaGuardia was identified by the Denver District Attorney's Organised Crime Unit as a bookmaker associated with the Smaldone brothers. In February 1972, LaGuardia and Ralph "Pizzazz" Pizzalato were suspected of shooting Richard Sanchez at the Alpine Inn. In April 1973, LaGuardia was arrested by the Denver Police Department Special Crime Attack Team for car theft and burglary, he was released on $25,000 bond. In July 1973, LaGuardia was suspected of shooting Pauline Smaldone, the wife of Clarence Smaldone, allegedly relation to a feud between LaGuardia, Ralph Pizzalato and Smaldone as LaGuardia attempted to conduct illegal gambling and loansharking operations separate from the Smaldone-Colorado family. In July 1973, LaGuardia was killed by a shotgun blast to his face, law enforcement suspected Ralph Pizzalato of carrying out the murder, Pizzalato was later murdered in January 1974.
- Vincenzo James Spinelli (born in April 1896 or April 1895) – former soldier. According to the Federal Bureau of Narcotics, Spinelli was naturalised in Houston in December 1918. Spinelli enlisted in WW1 in July 1917 whilst living in Denver located on 3341 Lipan Street and his discharge date was in December 1918 whilst residing in Leavenworth in Kansas. In 1921 and in March 1923, Spinelli was arrested for narcotics charges, and was released on $2500 bond. In May 1923, Spinelli was arrested at a lodging house located on 1731 Larimer Street for narcotics, and was identified by federal narcotics officers as "the primary drug dealer for the lower class of addicts in Denver", he was released on $2000 bond after pleading not guilty, he avoided conviction for these arrests, and during this time, he was partnered with Jacob "Jake" Cohen. In February 1927, Spinelli was arrested for violating the Prohibition law, as he was found guilty of providing and selling moonshine to Denver Police Department Vice Squad officers in Denver and Colorado, and in September 1927, he was sentenced to 5 years in prison at USP Leavenworth, and is believed to have been inducted into the Colorado family by the late 1920s, he was released in 1932. In March 1932, Spinelli received a suspended sentence for vagrancy. In April 1932, Spinelli indicted by the Department of Justice for Prohibition liquor violations and pled not guilty, the March vagrancy case was dismissed in May 1932. In June 1932, Spinelli was arrested for concealed weapons charges and police had seized several handguns and an automatic rifle from Spinelli, Spinelli was also arrested once again in June 1932 whilst driving in North Denver with Joe Roma, Clyde Smaldone and Charles Blanda for concealed weapons, Spinelli was convicted around a week later and sentenced to 30 days in jail with a fine of $100. In March 1933, Spinelli was indicted for violations of Prohibition, tax evasion, conspiracy and extortion along with Blanda, the Smaldone brothers, Burt Capra and Louis Brindisi. Spinelli and Blanda had threatened John "Red" McLoon around a week before the indictment under suspicion that McLoon had provided information leading to the arrest of Anthony Smaldone and Burt Capra, which forced McLoon to later became a witness at trial. In November 1936, Spinelli, Eugene and Clyde Smaldone were arrested for crimes not specified, and Spinelli was released the next day. In June 1937, Spinelli was fined $85 for reckless driving, concealed weapons and failing to produce a driver's license during an arrest in South Broadway. In May 1938 and in April 1940, Spinelli was arrested for driving offences and had his license revoked for 90 days. In April 1942, Spinelli was the registered manager of the Wash Café in Adams County, he or his wife had filed for divorce in February 1943, and Spinelli later remarried to Irene Walker by 1945. In June 1948, Spinelli held controlling interests in the Ace Music Company and also the North Federal Amusement Company. It is believed Spinelli was elevated to the position of capo by 1950. Spinelli was called upon as a witness to testify at the April 1953 trial of Paul Enrichi, along with Clyde Smaldone, both men had pled the fifth during questioning. By the mid to late-1950s, Spinelli operated The Circus Bar located on 5370 Morrison Road in Denver, and later sold the business in June 1957, and in July 1962, Spinelli operated Mary's Grill located on 1401 Lawrence Street in Denver. He died in May 1970.
- John Russell "Baby John" Foderaro (born on January 18, 1947) – former soldier. Foderaro was born in Pueblo, Colorado, and his family hailed from Catanzaro, Calabria and Palermo, his father, Samuel "Strawberry" Foderaro, was an associate of the Colorado family since at least the 1960s and active in Walsenburg. It is noted that his father, Sam, was arrested in November 1970 during a police raid of a gambling den located on 2514 Santa Fe Drive in Pueblo, Sam was also arrested along with Thomas "Whiskers" Incerto and Scotty Spinuzzi, also in December 1975, Sam was arrested by the FBI for illegal gambling as part of Operation Little House, along with Joseph "Joe Valley" Valentich and Frank Latino, Sam was sentenced to 1 year in prison for the FBI bust and received a 6 month prison sentence from an arrest in August 1976 for his involvement in an gambling ring operating from various restaurants in both Denver and Pueblo. By 1971, Foderaro was associated with Colorado family boss, Scotty Spinuzzi. In December 1971, Foderaro and accomplices, Robert Wirtz, Robert Schaak and Richard Ramey, participated in two burglaries at two Arapahoe Grocery stores in Pueblo. According to the Colorado Bureau of Investigation, Foderaro served a prison stint at the Buena Vista Correctional Facility by February 1974 for a robbery committed in Lamar, Prowers County. In December 1974, Foderaro was indicted along with Michael Anselmo and Allen Baird for burglary, theft, and conspiracy in relation to the Arapahoe burglaries in 1971. By October 1977, Foderaro was formally inducted into the Colorado family. In late 1978, Foderaro had hired Robert Wirtz, Robert Schaak and Burt Wright to assault the Pueblo County Commissioner, Albert H. Hayden Jr., after a verbal altercation between Hayden and Foderaro in October 1978. In February 1979, Foderaro surrendered to authorities for the charges of assault, burglary, conspiracy and criminal solicitation, he was released on $75,000 bail for assault and $50,000 for the other charges. In April 1980, Robert Schaak testified against Foderaro regarding Foderaro enlisting him to commit the assault against Albert Hayden, he was found guilty of assault and conspiracy and was sentenced to 6 years in prison, before Foderaro began his sentence, he had his lawyers contact the Pueblo District Attorney and offered information around government corruption and public bribery in exchange for probation, in turn, Foderaro was stabbed to death in November 1980 at Gino's Lounge located on 112 W 7th St, Pueblo in Colorado, Joe Valentich, an associate of the Colorado family, was suspected by law enforcement of carrying out the murder.
- John "Cha" Charles (born on May 12, 1898) – former soldier. Charles was born in Las Animas, Colorado, and his family hailed from Piedmont. Charles may have had served as the shooter of an unidentified man during an armed robbery near Beshoar road in Las Animas in May 1921. In June 1923, Charles married Rosa "Rose" Sirchia. By 1924, Charles was identified as an associate of the Colorado family and was affiliated with Pietro "Pete" Carlino and Salvatore "Sam" Carlino, and was involved in distributing alcohol at a soft drink parlour he had owned in Downtown Trinidad. In 1928, his home was bombed and refused to cooperate with law enforcement whom were investigating the bombing. In 1929, Charles attended a meeting with Pete Carlino, Joseph Roma, Nicola "Jimmy" Canzoneri and Paul D’Anna concerning the bootlegging business. In January 1930, Charles survived an attempted murder on his life and was wounded, however his friend, Jimmy Canzoneri, was killed by a shotgun blast. In April 1931, Charles was arrested by the authorities in California at the request of the Denver Police Department for Prohibition liquor violations and bootlegging, however in May 1931, the charges were dropped. Charles remained in California after he had sold his home in North Denver and a second home in Trinidad was also bombed, he returned to Colorado by 1935. In May 1938, Charles was arrested for misuse of public funds as a county park supervisor, around this time, Charles was also the President of the Colorado Young Democrats League in Las Animas, also indicted were Las Animas County board chairman, Mauro Cordova, foreman Sam Benavidez and transferred Bonanno family member and suspected Trinidad captain, Robert Victor Dionisio, Charles pled not guilty in June 1938, however he was sentenced to a maximum of 12 years in prison in August 1938, he was granted a pardon by Colorado Governor and U.S. Senator, Edwin C. Johnson, in January 1951. In November 1957, Charles lost to John Arko at the Trinidad City Council election. In January 1958, Charles was granted the council seat by Judge Harry Sayre. In June 1960, Charles was listed as a possible alternate delegation representative for the Democratic National Convention in Los Angeles for July 1960. In 1961, Charles served as a councilman under Mayor James E. Griffin. According to the Denver Police Department Intelligence Unit during the mid-1960s, he was listed as a member of the South Colorado Mafia faction, and became Mayor of Trinidad, Colorado during the 1960s, at the time, Charles was also the President of tbe Model Land & Irrigation Company. By June 1968, Charles oversaw the Sopris Housing Project in Northeast Trinidad as director of the Urban Renewal Authority with the project totalling $756,000, Charles resigned in November 1971, and did not seek re-election for the Trinidad City Council by November 1973. In September 1977, Charles was issued a firearms citation by Randall Hancock, a state wildlife conversation officer. He died in May 1997.
- Eugene "Checkers" Smaldone (born on July 8, 1910) – former boss. Smaldone was born in Denver and his family hailed from Basilicata. In 1925, Smaldone was first arrested for stealing vehicle accessories, and from between 1926 or 1927, he was incarcerated for stealing and stripping 25 cars. In September 1926, Smaldone was arrested for violating Prohibition laws. In April 1931, he married Frances Cefalu. In February 1932, Smaldone was arrested twice for weapons charges. Smaldone was suspected for being involved in the February 1933 murder of Joseph Roma, as a possible shooter. In March 1933, Smaldone was arrested for Prohibition conspiracy charges, and in April 1933, he was sentenced to 18 months in prison, Smaldone served his time at FCI Leavenworth and MCFP Springfield, he was released in July 1934. In 1936, Smaldone had partnered with gambler O. E. Stephens in the Blakeland Inn underground casino. In late 1936 or early 1937, Smaldone was convicted of assault, conspiracy and attempted murder after the failed murder of Leo Barnes, whom his car had exploded in December 1936, forcing Barnes to cooperate as a witness, Barnes was involved in a dispute with Stephens. Smaldone served his time at the Colorado State Penitentiary in Cañon City and was paroled in January 1943. Smaldone was suspected of orchestrating the March 1946 raid at the Wolhurst Club, where around $100,000 in cash was robbed. In late 1946 or early 1946, Anthony Colosacco and John "Shorty" West were summoned to the Gaetano's Restaurant by Smaldone and his brother, Clyde Smaldone, as Colosacco and West established an authorised barbuit game at Colorado family associate, John Priola's ranch in Adams County. West failed to appear and was kidnapped several days later by Frank "Blackie" Mazza, John "Porky" Routa and Paul Enrichi, later on, it was agreed that Colosacco would pay 50% of the profits to the Smaldone-Colorado family. It is believed Clyde and Eugene Smaldone were formally inducted into the Colorado family by at least 1951. By at least the early 1950s, the Colorado family began expanding their criminal operations into Louisville and Central City and diversified into rackets such as illegal gambling, loansharking and slot machines. It is believed by the early 1950s, Smaldone and his rackets were protected by the Sherriff's Department through payoffs. In January 1953, Smaldone was arrested for illegal gambling charges, in June 1953, Smaldone was arrested for tax evasion, and in September 1953, he was arrested for bribery and conspiracy. By February 1954, Smaldone was incarcerated at FCI Leavenworth on a 60 year prison sentence, and in mid-1995, the sentence was reduced to 12 years in prison, he was released in November 1962. In August 1963, Denver police department informant, Robert "Robin Roberts" Robbins was murdered, and Smaldone was a co-defendant in the trial, around this time, Smaldone was serving an 18 month prison sentence FCI La Tuna for another charge. During the later part of August in 1963, Smaldone was questioned by the Denver police department and refused to comply, and in September 1963, Smaldone was cited for contempt, however he never returned to prison. By December 1963, Smaldone was identified as working closely with the St. Louis family, in particular with illegal gambling, with St. Louis family associates working with Smaldone on behalf of Anthony Giordano, the boss of the St. Louis family. In January 1964, an barbuit game held at the VFW Club in Louisville and operated by the Smaldone faction, was robbed and held up by gunmen, an estimate $15,000 to $18,000 was seized, including $4000 from Colorado family associate, Albert "Squatash" Guarasci, was taken from him. By July 1964, the Los Angeles Police Department identified Smaldone as an associate of Jimmy Fratianno, a member of the Los Angeles family. In 1965, Smaldone established an illegal gambing operation held at the Northside Political Club located on 3700 Navajo Street. By October 1965, Smaldone was allegedly overseeing illegal gambling operations in Lakewood. In late October in 1965, a raid targeting Smaldone operations was cancelled after Smaldone was tipped by corrupt law enforcement officers. In November 1965, Smaldone's house located on 3314 West 37th Avenue was raided and Smaldone was arrested for illegal gambling charges. In January 1966, the Northside Political Club was raided by the Denver Police Department for violating state gambling laws and around $8000 in cash was also seized. According to informants in between September and August 1966, Smaldone was operating from the Centennial Park Race Track and Mile High Kennel Club. In July 1968, Smaldone was barred from all horse and dog race tracks in the state by the Colorado Racing Commission. Smaldone had allegedly shot Joseph Nuoci in April 1970, a bookmaker, in the armpit after he had lost around $3000 in cash, along with jewellery and a television set, on behalf of an incarcerated member, Nuoci survived and later became a trial witness. It is noted that in February 1972, Smaldone attended a meeting in Kansas City with Joseph "Scotty" Spinuzzi, Frank Bompensiero and with Kansas City members, Nicholas Civella and William Cammisano Sr., in regard to infiltrating Las Vegas casinos. In September 1973, Smaldone was convicted for illegal gambling charges and was sentenced to 42 months in prison with a $2500 fine, and began his sentence in June 1974. In around September 1975, it is believed Smaldone was promoted to the position of boss of the Colorado family following the death of former boss, Scotty Spinuzzi, and elevated his brother, Clarence Smaldone, to underboss and acting boss of the family. Smaldone has ben linked to ordering the November 1980 murder of John R. Foderaro after Foderaro was claimed to have had been exploring cooperative options following legal pressure, Foderaro was stabbed to death inside of Gino Lounge's in Pueblo by Colorado family associate, Joseph "Joe Valley" Valentich. In September 1982, Smaldone was indicted for loansharking, tax evasion and possession of a firearm silencer, and was convicted in December 1982, he was sentenced to 10 years in prison and was released in December 1988. Smaldone was driven by Joe Valentich to the hospital for colon surgery, where he died of a heart attack, in March 1992.
- Agostino Salardino (born on April or March 27, 1907) – former consigliere. Salardino was born in Monroe, Louisiana, and his family hailed from Sicily. By 1910, the Salardino family moved to Rockvale, Fremont County in Colorado. Salardino graduated from Florence High School in 1925. In December 1927, Salardino was arrested for alcohol possession during a raid by the local Sherriff's office, Salardino pled guilty two days later and was sentenced to 30 days in jail with a $100 fine. In June 1928, Salardino assaulted Deputy Sherriff Allen McLoney in Florence and was scheduled for trial in July 1928, it is believed he was acquitted. By 1930, Salardino was a registered pool hall manager and was living with his brother in Rockvale. In around 1932, Salardino was the owner of the Florence Wholesale Liquor Company in Fremont County. According to information by LA family informant, Frank Bompensiero, in August 1968, Salardino was a member of the Colorado family since at least 1933. In December 1933, Salardino owned and established the Golden Nugget nightclub which closed in 1940, around this time, Salardino was heavily involved in illegal gambling and jukebox operations. In May 1936, Salardino was indicted along with John Julius Fabrizio for fraud and improper records in connection to alcohol taxes, and was released on $2000 bail. By 1940, Salardino married Julian Antista. In 1940, following the closure of his Golden Nugget nightclub, Salardino moved to Cañon City and opened Sali's Restaurant. In April 1942, Salardino was drafted for WW2 and was discharged in 1945. In May 1945, Salardino married Doris Irene Nelson in Spokane, Washington. In 1945, Salardino opened the Sali's Club Paradise nightclub in Cañon City, and by 1950, Salardino was a registered nightclub owner. According to a report made by the Kefauver Committee, Salardino headed an illegal gambling operation out of the Sali's Paradise nightclub, and his nightclub was raided by Cañon City District Attorney John S. Witcher in March 1950, Salardino was released on a $500 bond. Salardino attended the 1955 wedding in Brooklyn of Detroit family member, Anthony Joseph Tocco, and his wife, Carmella Profaci, the daughter of Joe Profaci, the boss of the Profaci-Colombo family from New York. In November 1957, Salardino was appointed membership of the board of directors for the Colorado Tuberculosis Association. According to the Denver police department intelligence unit, Salardino was heavily involved in illegal gambling and loansharking, by the late 1950s. Salardino died in March 1978.
- Guy "Mickey" McNulty (born on November 17, 1926 or 1927) – former associate. McNulty was born in Mound City, Missouri. In November 1944, McNulty was drafted as a farm labourer and was discharged in October 1945. In December 1950, McNulty married Iva Isabell Collins in Buchanan County, Missouri. It is believed McNulty first became associated with the Colorado family by 1955. In April 1961, McNulty was first arrested for illegal gambling, along with William Pace. In May 1961, McNulty was arrested during an illegal gambling raid, along with Eugene Louis Smaldone, Michael "MT" Tomeo and Robert Charles Paoli, he was sentenced to 18 months in prison and fined $3650 in June 1961. In September 1961, he was arrested during an illegal gambling raid in North Denver. In January 1962, he was arrested for illegal gambling. In August 1963, he was arrested for in relation to the August 1963 murder of Denver police informant, Robert "Robin Roberts" Robbins. In 1966, McNulty operated a newly established bookmaking telephone line, Colorado family capo, Joseph "Scotty" Spinuzzi, was also involved. In December 1966, McNulty and Spinuzzi were arrested by the Denver Police Department Intelligence Division and by the Pueblo County Sheriffs Office, and in April 1968, McNulty was fined $1000, McNulty was incarcerated around this time after he was sentenced to 9 months in prison following his arrest in November 1967 for illegal gambling in Boulder, Colorado. In July 1968, McNulty was barred from entry to all dog and horse tracks in the state by the Colorado Racing Commission. In December 1970, McNulty was arrested by the Glendale Police Department in Colorado for illegal gambling in Arapahoe County and was released from custody. McNulty was arrested in 1971 for solicitation. According to information from the Denver District Attorney's Organised Crime Unit in 1971, he was identified as an associate of Eugene "Checkers" Smaldone. In July 1972, McNulty was indicted, along with Harry Anthony Villano, Frank Garceo, Dennis Valley and Michael Valley. McNulty had been living with Smaldone from between November 1971 and January 1972, and assisted Smaldone with his illegal gambling operations. In June 1972, McNulty was arrested for drunk driving in Aurora, Adams County. In around September or October 1972, he was sentenced to 1 year in prison with a $2500 fine for illegal gambling. In March 1974, he was convicted of failure to report employees withholding tax in relation to cash payments to Chas "Carl" Smith and Robert Nelson, and in April 1974, he was arrested for conspiracy and illegal gambling, and received a sentence of 5 years in prison however the sentence was later suspended. In December 1977, in April 1978 and in March, June and December of 1979, McNulty was arrested but never convicted of illegal gambling charges in Denver, however he pled guilty to illegal gambling in mid-December 1979. In February 1981, he was arrested for illegal gambling and among other crimes in Lakewood. In April 1983, McNulty was indicted in Jefferson County for the February 1981 gambling charges, and began serving his 3 year prison sentence in June 1983, he was released in April 1985. He died in January 1999.

== List of murders committed by the Colorado crime family ==
| Name | Date | Reason |
|---|---|---|
| Robin "Walkie Talkie" Roberts | August 7, 1963 | Roberts had operated the illegal gambling rackets for Eugene Smaldone and Clarence Smaldone. It is believed Roberts was revealed to be an informant for the police and that he had also owed the Colorado family a significant amount of money. According to police, the Smaldone brothers and Paul "Fat Paulie" Villano were considered as the suspects in the Roberts murder. |
| John "Skip" LaGuardia | July 20, 1973 | 30-year old LaGuardia had served as the driver and bodyguard of Eugene "Checkers" Smaldone, whom was the boss of the Colorado family from between 1975 and 1992. LaGuardia had owned The Alpine Inn, a restaurant and bar. LaGuardia was shot in the face by a shotgun and then bludgeoned to death at his home. Prior to his murder, it is believed he had orchestrated an attack on Smaldone's sister-in-law with gunshot wounds to her leg and shoulder. LaGuardia was allegedly murdered as Smaldone believed he may of seized control of the Colorado family. |
| Giovanni "Baby John" Foderaro | November 24, 1980 | Foderaro had served as a close associate to Joseph "Scotty" Spinuzzi, whom had served as the boss of the Colorado family from between 1969 to 1975. It is believed the 33-year old Foderaro was publicly dissatisfied of the new leadership with Eugene "Checkers" Smaldone taking over the family, and was stabbed 16 times with his throat slit. |

== See also ==
- Crime in Colorado
- List of Italian Mafia crime families
