= Jamie Wall =

Jamie Wall may refer to:

- Jamie Wall (racing driver)
- Jamie Wall (politician)

== See also ==
- James Wall (disambiguation)
