= Seby Zavala =

American baseball player (born 1993)

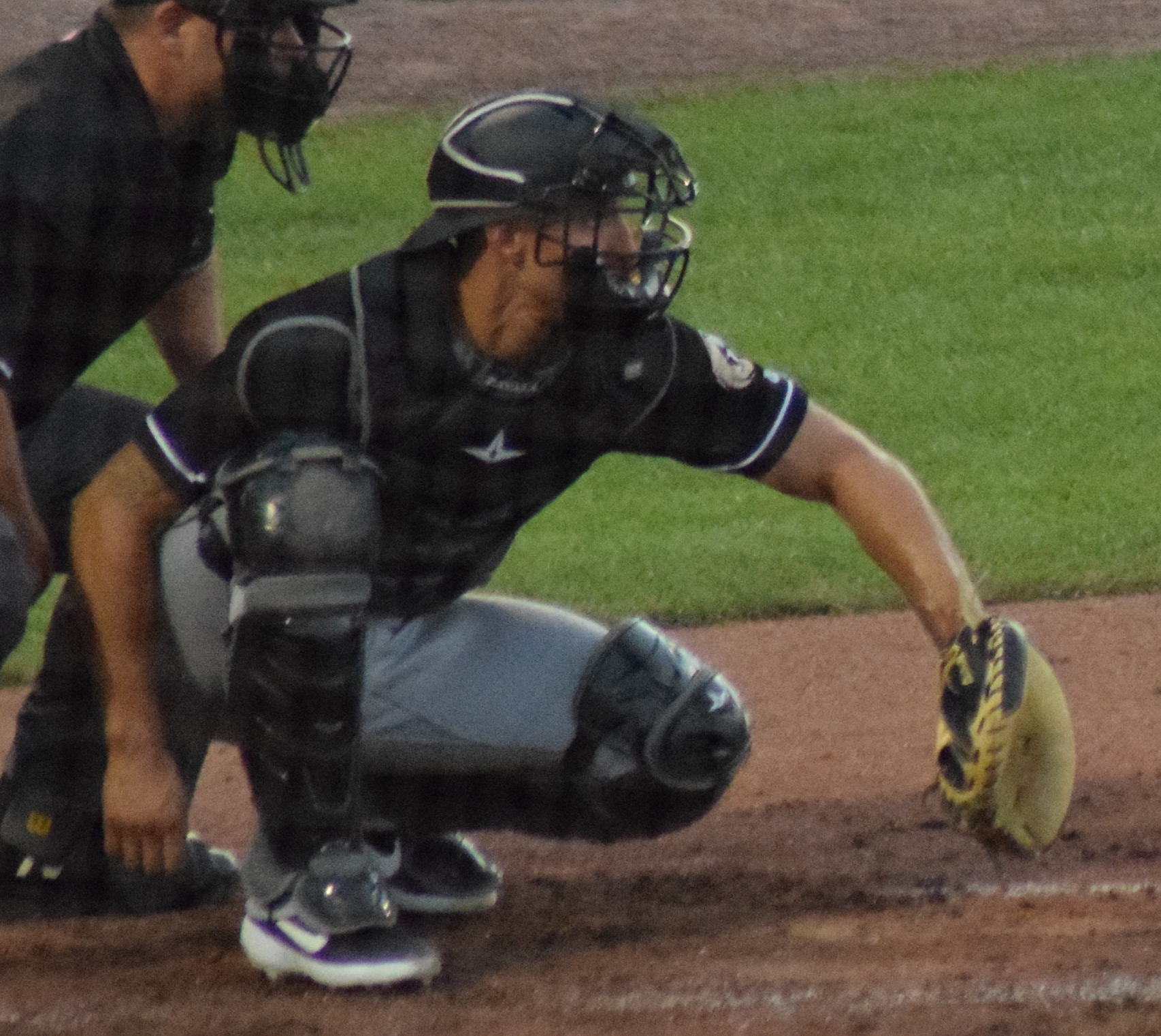
- Zavala with the Charlotte Knights in 2019

Free agent
- Catcher
- Born: August 28, 1993 (age 33); Fort Hood, Texas, U.S.
- Bats: Right Throws: Right

MLB debut
- May 25, 2019, for the Chicago White Sox

MLB statistics (through 2024 season)
- Batting average: .205
- Home runs: 15
- Runs batted in: 56
- Stats at Baseball Reference

Teams
- Chicago White Sox (2019, 2021–2023); Arizona Diamondbacks (2023); Seattle Mariners (2024)

Bernardo Sebastian Zavala (born August 28, 1993) is an American professional baseball catcher who is a free agent. He has previously played in Major League Baseball (MLB) for the Chicago White Sox, Arizona Diamondbacks, and Seattle Mariners.

== Amateur career ==
Zavala attended Bishop Amat High School in La Puente, California. His high school baseball team won its league title in 2010 and 2011, with Zavala hitting .321 his senior season. He then played college baseball at San Diego State University. He missed the 2013 season due to Tommy John surgery. In his junior season in 2015, he led the Aztecs with 14 home runs, 67 RBI, and a .936 on-base plus slugging. He was named the MVP of the Mountain West Conference tournament.

== Professional career ==
=== Chicago White Sox ===
Zavala was selected by the Chicago White Sox in the 12th round of the 2015 Major League Baseball draft. He received a $100,000 signing bonus. Zavala made his professional debut that summer with the Arizona League White Sox, batting .326/.401/.628 with four home runs and 35 RBIs in 35 games. He spent 2016 with the Kannapolis Intimidators, where he batted .253 with seven home runs and 49 RBIs in 93 games. He played for Kannapolis and the Winston-Salem Dash in 2017, hitting a combined .282 with 21 home runs, 72 RBIs, and an .851 on-base plus slugging (OPS) in 107 games with the two teams. After the season, he played in the Arizona Fall League for the Glendale Desert Dogs. Zavala was invited to spring training by the White Sox in 2018 and started the season with the Birmingham Barons. He was named a Southern League mid-season All-Star and promoted to the Triple-A Charlotte Knights in June.

After the 2018 season, the White Sox added Zavala to their 40-man roster to protect him from the Rule 5 draft. He returned to the Charlotte Knights to begin 2019. On May 25, 2019, he was called up from Charlotte following an injury to Welington Castillo. He made his major league debut that day, facing the Minnesota Twins. He got his first career MLB hit and only hit of the 2019 season on May 31, hitting a single against Cleveland. Zavala played in five White Sox games in 2019, striking out in 9 of his 12 at bats.

Zavala did not play in an official game in the shortened 2020 season, spending the summer at the White Sox alternate training site in Schaumberg, Illinois. He returned to Charlotte to begin the 2021 season. On July 6, Zavala was recalled by the White Sox after Yasmani Grandal went on the 10-day IL. On July 31, in his 18th major league game, Zavala became the first player to hit his first three MLB home runs in the same game, doing so in a 12–11 loss to the Cleveland Indians. He hit his first two off of Triston McKenzie, one of them a grand slam, then his third off of Bryan Shaw. His fourth home run came in the Field of Dreams Game.

On April 7, 2022, Zavala was sent outright to Triple-A Charlotte. On June 12, Zavala's contract was selected, and he was called up to the major leagues following another injury to Grandal. On September 3, he caught Dylan Cease's no-hit bid, broken up in the 9th inning. Zavala said he started thinking about the no-hitter in the third inning. Zavala's season ended when he was placed on the concussion list on September 27. In 61 games for the White Sox, he slashed .270/.347/.382 with two home runs and 21 RBI.

In 66 games for Chicago in 2023, Zavala batted .155/.207/.304 with a career-high 7 home runs and 16 RBI. On September 4, Zavala was designated for assignment by the White Sox.

=== Arizona Diamondbacks ===
On September 6, 2023, Zavala was claimed off waivers by the Arizona Diamondbacks. Zavala appeared in 7 games for Arizona down the stretch, including one scoreless inning as a pitcher and batting 5-for-14. He was not eligible for the team's postseason roster because he was acquired after September 1.

=== Seattle Mariners ===
On November 22, 2023, Zavala and pitcher Carlos Vargas were traded to the Seattle Mariners for Eugenio Suárez. Zavala was the Mariners' third catcher behind Cal Raleigh and Mitch Garver, both of whom also started at designated hitter. In 18 games for Seattle in 2024, he hit .154/.214/.282 with one home run and two RBI.Though he did not play often or well, Zavala did let Raleigh borrow his catcher's mitt, which helped Raleigh keep his catching hand healthy en route to a Platinum Glove Award.

On June 18, Zavala was designated for assignment by the Mariners. He cleared waivers and was sent outright to the Triple-A Tacoma Rainiers on June 22. On July 2, the Mariners purchased Zavala's contract, adding him back to the major league roster. However, he did not appear in any games and was Designated for assignment again on July 6. Zavala cleared waivers and returned to Tacoma via outright assignment on July 8. On September 10, the Mariners selected Zavala's contract. He again did not appear for Seattle before he was designated for assignment on September 13. Zavala cleared waivers and returned to Tacoma via outright assignment on September 16. He elected free agency on October 2.

=== Boston Red Sox ===
On November 20, 2024, Zavala signed a minor league contract with the Boston Red Sox. He began the 2025 season with the Triple-A Worcester Red Sox. Zavala suffered an oblique injury after nine games in April, returning to action in May. In 67 appearances for Worcester, he batted .165 with eight home runs and 25 RBI; he did not play in the majors in 2025. Zavala elected free agency following the season on November 6.

=== Los Angeles Dodgers ===
On February 5, 2026, Zavala signed a minor league contract with the Los Angeles Dodgers. He was assigned to the Triple-A Oklahoma City Comets to begin the regular season. In 16 appearances for the Comets, Zavala batted .196/.323/.353 with two home runs and eight RBI. Zavala was released by the Dodgers organization on June 5.

=== Charros de Jalisco ===
On June 12, 2026, Zavala signed with the Charros de Jalisco of the Mexican League. Zavala played in 34 contests for Jalisco, slashing .248/.269/.376 with two home runs, 13 RBI, and one stolen base.

=== Detroit Tigers ===
On August 6, 2026, Zavala signed a minor league contract with the Detroit Tigers and was assigned to the Triple-A Toledo Mud Hens. In 22 games with Triple-A Toledo Mud Hens he batted .247/.345/.356 with 2 home runs and 8 RBIs. He elected free agency on November 2.
