= Matthew Trupiano =

American mob boss

- Born: November 8, 1938; Detroit, Michigan, U.S.
- Died: October 22, 1997 (aged 58); St. Anthony's Medical Center; South St. Louis County, Missouri, U.S.
- Other names: Mike Trupiano, Mikey Trupiano
- Status: Deceased
- Conviction: Running a gambling operation
- Penalty: 4 years imprisonment (16 months served)

Matthew M. "Mike" Trupiano Jr. (November 8, 1938 – October 22, 1997) was the boss of the St. Louis crime family from 1982 to 1997.

== Early life ==
Matthew Trupiano was born on November 8, 1938, in Detroit to a Sicilian-American family. His father immigrated from Messina and met his future wife in Detroit. Trupiano eventually ran into gambling problems with the Detroit Partnership, the local Cosa Nostra organization, and was forced to leave the city.

== St. Louis crime family ==
With the help of his uncle, St. Louis crime family boss Anthony Giordano, Trupiano moved to St. Louis. He soon became president of the crime family-controlled Local 110 of the Laborers' International Union of North America (LIUNA). After Giordano died in 1980 and John "Johnny V." Vitale. became boss, Trupiano was allowed to become a made man in the family. When Vitale died in 1982, Trupiano succeeded him as boss, and Joseph Cammarata became his underboss.

In 1991, Trupiano was arrested for operating an illegal gin rummy game in the back of a St. Louis car dealership. Since Trupiano was a union officer gambling on union work time, prosecutors could charge him with embezzlement of union funds. In June 1992, due to the criminal charges, Local 110 voted Trupiano out of office. In October 1992, Trupiano was convicted of one illegal gambling charge and was sentenced to 30 months in prison. The judge advised Trupiano to stay away from gambling. In poor health, Trupiano was released from prison after serving 16 months.

Trupiano suffered a heart attack at his home on October 22, 1997, and was pronounced dead at St. Anthony's Medical Center in South St. Louis County, Missouri.

Business positions
Preceded by John "Johnny V." Vitale as boss	St. Louis crime family Acting boss 1982-1997	Succeeded by Anthony "Nino" Parrino
