= James Wall =

James Wall may refer to:

- James Walter Wall (1820–1872), United States Senator from New Jersey
- James S. Wall (born 1964), American prelate of the Roman Catholic Church
- James Wall (diplomat), former Canadian ambassador to Angola and Eritrea and current ambassador to the Netherlands
- James Wall (actor) (1917–2010), American actor and stage manager
- James Wall (footballer) (born 1980), English footballer
- James Charles Wall (1860–1943), British ecclesiologist and historian
- James Wall (comedian) (1863–1927), American comedian and minstrel
- James M. Wall (1928–2021), American Methodist minister and journalist

== See also ==
- Wall (surname)
