= Virginia Sarpy Peugnet =

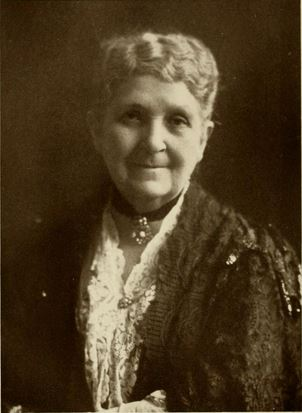
Virginia Sarpy Peugnet

Virginia Sarpy Peugnet (July 4, 1827 – August 11, 1917) was one of the three original grand dames of St. Louis, Missouri.

== Grand Dames ==
The three Grand Dames of St. Louis were Mrs. Scanlan, Mrs. Peter L. Foy, and Mme. Armand Peugnet. They were invited to act as official hostesses for many noted personages who were entertained by the city. They used a white stone mansion on Grand and Lucas Avenues, where Mrs. Scanlan presided for many years with the dignity of a queen. The mansion is no longer extant.

== Founding of St. Louis ==
Virginia Sarpy Peugnet was descendant of Pierre Laclède and Marie-Thérèse Bourgeois Chouteau. Pierre Laclède was born in 1724 and came from Bedous, France, when thirty-one years old, reaching Louisiana in 1755. Marie-Thérèse Bourgeois Chouteau, a daughter of a French officer, and a lady-in-waiting from the court of Cádiz, Spain. Shortly after the Bourgeois, Nicolas Bourgeois and Marie Joseph Tarare, arrived in New Orleans, where Nicolas Bourgeois' brother had established himself in business, Marie-Thérèse Bourgeois was born, and a few months later the father died. When Marie-Thérèse Bourgeois was six years old, her mother, a woman who stood high in the Catholic Church, died, and the child was placed in the Ursuline Convent in New Orleans, where she was reared.

When very young she was married to René Auguste Chouteau, a New Orleans business man, who was born in Bearne, France, in 1739. To them was born a son, Auguste Chouteau, September 17, 1750. Her second marriage was with Pierre Laclède, to whom she was evidently deeply attached. Marie-Thérèse Bourgeois Chouteau died in St. Louis, on August 14, 1814, at the age of eighty-one years, leaving many, many descendants.

Pierre Laclède was a member of the firm of Maxent, Laclede & Co., of New Orleans. He was sent up the Mississippi River to establish a permanent trading post by his firm. Laclède, with Chouteau and their four children - and her oldest son, Auguste — left New Orleans in crude boats, on August 3, 1763, and three months later reached Ste. Genevieve, Missouri, where there was no building large enough to store the goods brought by them. In 1763 the country east of the Mississippi had been ceded to the English. The commandant at Fort Chartres, about twenty miles above Ste. Genevieve, offered storage room until the English should arrive to take possession. This fort had been built by the French in 1720 for defense against the Spaniards. It was the best-built fort in North America. The offer was accepted by Laclède, and they reached there on November 3, 1763.

The winter was passed at Fort de Chartres by Chouteau and her children, but Laclède and Auguste Chouteau went as far north as St. Charles, Missouri to find a location on the west bank of the Mississippi where they could establish a settlement. The spot was selected and trees marked, and they returned to Fort de Chartres to await the breaking up of the ice on the river. In the words of Laclède to Chouteau, "You will proceed to the site on the left bank of the river, where we blazed the trees, and erect a house to store the tools and shelter the men. I give you two men on whom you can depend to aid you, and I will join you before long." Chouteau wrote the account of this expedition, his original manuscript in French now being in the Mercantile Library of St. Louis. It was translated and published by the library in 1858. It is, however, very short—only a few pages. Chouteau went in the boat with thirty men, arriving on February 14, 1764, and Laclède, on horseback, accompanied Marie-Thérèse Bourgeois Chouteau, who rode in a cart with her children, and with Antoine Riviere, Sr., as driver, to Cahokia, Illinois, where she waited until a house was built for her on the site of St. Louis.

History tells of the growth of the city. Pierre Laclède died in June, 1778, while en route from New Orleans to St. Louis, where it was his custom to spend the winters in the interest of Laclède, Maxent & Co. His body was buried about two hundred yards back from the banks of the Mississippi at the mouth of the Arkansas, near a town called Napoleon, Arkansas, in a beautiful spot which was afterwards a cemetery until washed away by the river. The castle where the family of Laclède lived in France has been visited by some of his descendants. The name was originally "de Laclède", but the prefix was dropped. George Julian Zolnay, who made a statue of Laclède, visited Bedous, the birthplace of Laclède, studying the features of members of the family living there, one of whom, Dr. Madamet, was Mayor of Bedous. His mother was a Laclède, and in him Zolnay found a great resemblance to the portrait of Pierre Laclède. The statue was a gift to the City of St. Louis from the Centennial Association.

Auguste Chouteau was thirty-eight years old at the time of Laclède's death. He married Marie Therese Cerre, of Kaskaskia, Illinois, in 1769. She died in St. Louis in 1842. He died in 1825. They had seven children: Auguste A., Henri, Edward, Gabriel Sylvestre, Eulalie, Louise and Emilie.

== Family ==
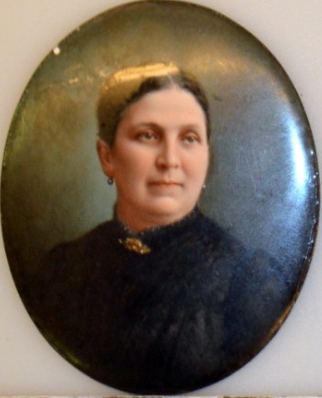
Virginia Sarpy Berthold Peugnet by Matthew DeRoche

By the union of Marie-Thérèse Bourgeois Chouteau with Pierre Laclède four children were born. Pierre Chouteau was born in New Orleans in 1758, and died July 9, 1849. There were three daughters, Marie Louise, who married Marie Joseph Papin; Victoire, who married Charles Gratiot, and Pelagic, Mrs. Sylvestre Labaddie. Pierre Chouteau was married first to Pelagie Kiersereau, and secondly to Brigite Saucier. Victoire married Charles Gratiot, a Canadian, and their daughter, Julia Gratiot, born 1782, died 1852, married John Pierre Cabanne, and their daughter, Jeanne Victorare Adele Cabanne (1803–1832), married John Baptiste Sarpy (1798–1857), whose daughter was Virginia Sarpy.

Virginia Sarpy was born on July 4, 1827. Adele, the first wife of John Sarpy died when their only child, Virginia, was four years old. Later he married a second time, to Martha Jane Russell (1817–1844), of the Irish family of O'Bannon, by whom he had two children, one the wife of James L. D. Morrison, who figured in the political and land-dealing history of Illinois. After the death of Sarpy's second wife, Virginia brought up the family of stepsister and stepbrother, assisted by her Grandmother Cabanne, who was her own mother's mother, but the children were never taken out of their own home which was then where later the Carleton Building stood, on Sixth and Olive Streets. Virginia's first schooling was with Mme. Vitalis, who undertook the education of a limited number of girls, followed by a year in the Sacred Heart Convent; and, later, a short course at a female academy at Steubenville, Ohio, from which she was called on account of the last illness of her stepmother. Just before her death Virginia's father was induced to take the family to Ste. Genevieve, where his wife could have the benefit of treatment by Father Celeni, a venerable priest, who was noted for his skill in making cures with herbs and nature's remedies. However, after remaining there for some time it was found to be futile; she died of consumption very soon after.

The journey to the oldest settlement in the State was a delightful childish remembrance to Virginia Sarpy Peugnet. At that time, relatives of the family were living in Ste. Genevieve, engaged in the milling business under the name of Chouteau, Harrison & Valle. The old Chouteau mansion was still standing two miles above the town on the river bank, where the mill also stood, but which was later destroyed by fire.

Virginia Sarpy Peugnet's father was a member of the American Fur Trading Co., the other members being relatives of Virginia Sarpy Peugnet's father's first wife — Mr. Sire and Mr. Chouteau. Their dealings were with the Native Americans, trading goods for furs.

Virginia Sarpy married first Frederick A. Berthold (1821–1868), son of Bertholomew Berthold, and Pelagie Chouteau, who was the daughter of Pierre Chouteau and his second wife, Brigite Saucier.

Her second marriage was to Armand Bernard Peugnet (1833–1894), a member of the French diplomatic corps. She had one son, Maurice Bernard Peugnet (1871–1914), a widower with seven children, and two daughters, Claire Pelagie Berthold (1866–1950) and Eugenie Berthold (1868–1962), who never married. Other two children are: Amedee Bartholomew Berthold (1849–1864) and Louisa Berthold Weinmann (1850–1910).

After her second marriage, Virginia Sarpy Peugnet traveled abroad considerably during her husband's office of Consul in Germany, Spain and France.

Virginia Sarpy Peugnet died on August 11, 1917. She is buried at Calvary Cemetery (St. Louis).
