= John Vitale (mobster) =

American mob boss

John Joseph Vitale
- Born: May 17, 1909; St. Louis, Missouri, US
- Died: June 5, 1982 (aged 73); St. Louis, Missouri, US
- Resting place: Calvary Cemetery (St. Louis)
- Occupation: Organized crime
- Spouse(s): Fara Marie Ciaramitaro, Mildred Joyce Vitale (NEE: Allen)
- Children: Joseph John Vitale, Mary Ann Vitale, John L. Vitale, Rosetta Vitale, Michelle Vitale, other relatives: Rio Vitale, Morgan Vitale

John Joseph Vitale (May 17, 1909 – June 5, 1982) was a Sicilian-American boss and underboss of the St. Louis crime family. During his lifetime, Vitale was the boss of the St. Louis crime family.

== Early life ==
John J. Vitale was born in St. Louis, Missouri, in 1909. Both of Vitale's parents were born in Sicily; his father in Trapani and his mother in Termini Imerese. They immigrated to the United States a few years before John was born. During the Great Depression he worked as an usher at the Ambassador Theater where he met movie actress Ginger Rogers; the two became lifelong friends.

On September 8, 1929, he married Fara Marie Sharamitaro. Together, they had four children.

After Fara died in July 1973 John married Mildred Joyce Allen on August 4, 1973, in Las Vegas, Nevada. They moved back to St. Louis, Missouri to start their family together, including Mary Michelle Vitale, who was age 13 at the time.

Vitale's arrest record began c. 1920, though he was rarely convicted. For example, in 1934, he was a suspect in the death of Mike Palazzolo. According to St. Louis investigative reporter John Auble, Palazzolo allegedly had an ongoing quarrel with a man named Walter Mushenick. In May 1934, Mushenick assaulted Palazzolo's girlfriend Delphine, slapping her in the face. After Delphine informed Palazzolo of the assault, Palazzolo stated that, "he was going to get even with Mushenick..." Witnesses stated that when Palazzolo left his parents' house to visit a friend, Vitale arrived and waited for him to return. After returning home, Palazzolo left with Vitale in Vitale's car. That was the last time Palazzolo was seen alive. The coroner determined that Palozzolo was shot twice with a .38 caliber, a single shot through the head and neck, and another in the chest. Though a warrant was issued for his arrest, Vitale was exonerated of the murder.

== St. Louis crime family ==
Little is known of Vitale's early years in the syndicate, as he was known for keeping a low profile. His last run in with the law was in 1980 when he was arrested for having US$30,000 in his pocket.

=== Sonny Liston affair ===
The St. Louis crime family held financial interests in the career of Sonny Liston, a professional boxer. According to both FBI and newspaper reports, Vitale, in addition to other underworld crime figures, "reportedly controlled Liston's contract," by owning approximately twelve percent of the boxer's contract. However, when a congressional committee inquired into the matter, he refused to answer any questions.

=== Other activities ===
Vitale was sent to federal prison once on a narcotics charge during the 1950s. In 1958, he was charged with the federal crime of transporting firearms across state lines, which he appealed. In February 1959, he was called to testify regarding mafia-controlled coin machine rackets, but invoked the Fifth Amendment to the United States Constitution against self-incrimination. In 1977, he was charged with assault and sentenced to the St. Louis City workhouse.

== Final days ==
Four sources claim that Vitale later became an FBI informant following the death of boss Anthony "Tony G." Giordano. However, no evidence has been provided to substantiate this claim. Further, Vitale remained the boss after Giordano's death, dying of natural causes in St. Louis as an elderly man. He died on June 5, 1982 and was buried on June 9, 1982, in Calvary Cemetery in St. Louis. He was preceded in death by his wife Fara, who was buried on July 20, 1973, in Calvary Cemetery.

Ancestors of John Joseph Vitale

16.
8.
17.
4. John Vitale
18.
9.
19.
2. Joseph Vitale, Sr.
20.
10.
21.
5. Theresa Toia
22.
11.
23.
1. John Joseph Vitale
24.
12. Salvatore Bovaconti
25.
6. Joseph Bovacanti
26.
13. Maria Masitio
27.
3. Mary Theresa Bovacanti
28. Marco Cianciolo
14. Giuseppe Nicolo Cianciolo
29. Cosima da Vinci
7. Marie Cianciolo
30. Lorenzo Palmisano
15. Anna Agostina Palmisano
31. Mary Ardizzone Caito

Business positions
Unknown	St. Louis crime family Underboss unknown–1980	Succeeded by Joseph Cammarata
Preceded by Anthony "Tony G." Giordano as boss	St. Louis crime family Acting boss 1980-1982	Succeeded by Matthew M. "Mike" Trupiano, Jr.
