= Inter-Agency Space Debris Coordination Committee =

Inter-governmental forum

The Inter-Agency Space Debris Coordination Committee (IADC) is an inter-governmental forum whose aim is to co-ordinate efforts to deal with debris in orbit around the Earth founded in 1993. The primary purposes of the IADC is information exchange on space debris research activities, facilitating opportunities for joint research, and reviewing progress of ongoing activities. All of these are designed to support identification of space debris mitigation options.

== Debris mitigation guidance ==
In March 2020, the organization has developed recommendations that each program or project establish and document a feasible Space Debris Mitigation Plan. The plan should include the following items:

- A management plan addressing space debris mitigation activities
- A plan for the assessment and mitigation of risks related to space debris, including applicable standards
- The measures minimising the hazard related to malfunctions that have a potential for generating space debris
- A plan for disposal of the spacecraft and/or orbital stages at end of mission
- Justification of choice and selection when several possibilities exist
- Compliance matrix addressing the recommendations of these Guidelines

== Members ==
Members of the IADC include:

- Agenzia Spaziale Italiana (ASI)
- Centre National d'Etudes Spatiales (CNES)
- China National Space Administration (CNSA)
- Canadian Space Agency (CSA)
- German Aerospace Center (DLR)
- European Space Agency (ESA)
- Indian Space Research Organisation (ISRO)
- Japan Aerospace Exploration Agency (JAXA)
- Korea Aerospace Research Institute (KARI)
- National Aeronautics and Space Administration (NASA)
- Russian Federal Space Agency (ROSCOSMOS)
- State Space Agency of Ukraine (SSAU)
- United Kingdom Space Agency (UKSA)

== See also ==
- Orbital Debris Co-ordination Working Group
