= Anthony Giordano =

American mobster

- Born: June 24, 1914; St. Louis, Missouri
- Died: August 29, 1980 (aged 65); St. Louis, Missouri
- Resting place: Calvary Cemetery, St. Louis, Missouri
- Occupation: Organized crime
- Spouse: Catherine P. Burns
- Children: William Giordano (adopted)

Antonio Rico Giuseppe Giordano (June 24, 1914 – August 29, 1980) was the boss of the St. Louis crime family.

== Early life ==
Anthony Giordano, nicknamed "Tony G", was born June 24, 1914, in St. Louis, Missouri. He married Catherine P. Burns, and together they adopted a son named William Giordano.

== St. Louis crime family ==
Beginning in 1938, Giordano was arrested more than fifty times; his charges included carrying concealed weapons, robbery, holdups, income tax evasion, and counterfeiting tax stamps. In his early years, Giordano wore the wide-brimmed pearl gray hats, expensive suits, and rings favored by many mobsters of that time.

He was uncle to Matthew "Mike" Trupiano, who later became boss. Giordano was also a cousin to the Licavolis. He was an uncle to St. Louis crime family capo James Giammanco.

Giordano was known for his explosive temper. In 1965, he threatened a Federal Bureau of Investigation (FBI) agent who was trying to ask him questions at his restaurant. On another occasion, in 1970, Giordano grabbed and physically threatened a priest who was trying to retrieve a stolen church vehicle at Giordano's towing company.

== Criminal career ==
In the early 1950s, Giordano made several trips to Anzio, Italy, to smuggle heroin into the United States. The US Federal Bureau of Narcotics observed him on three trips but did not gather enough evidence to indict him. In 1956, Giordano was convicted of income tax evasion for his vending machine company and was sentenced to four years in federal prison. When family boss John Vitale retired in 1960, Giordano took over the St. Louis crime family.

By the 1960s, Giordano had assumed a lower profile as a blue-collar worker. He and his wife lived in a conservative home in southwest St. Louis. Giordano was often seen in work clothes at his rental properties performing carpentry or plumbing chores. In February 1968, he was arrested as a suspected gambler during a citywide crackdown on gamblers. In 1972 he was convicted of illegally skimming gambling proceeds from the Aladdin Hotel & Casino in Paradise, Nevada, through the Emprise Corporation with Michael "Big Mike" Polizzi and Anthony "Tony Z" Zerilli, members of the Detroit Partnership.

In 1975, Giordano was convicted on charges of secretly trying to obtain ownership in the New Frontier Hotel and Casino in Paradise, Nevada, and was sent to prison. He was released in 1977. Giordano died on August 29, 1980, and was buried on September 2, 1980, in Calvary Cemetery, St. Louis City, Missouri. His wife Catherine survived him and died December 29, 2007. She was buried on January 2, 2008, in Calvary Cemetery, St. Louis City, Mo.

Business positions
Preceded by John "Johnny V." Vitale as boss	St. Louis crime family Acting boss 1960s-1980	Succeeded by John "Johnny V." Vitale
