= James Wall (comedian) =

American comedian and minstrel

James Lee Wall (1863 – June 12, 1927) was an American actor and singer, best known as a comedian and minstrel.

== Biography ==
Wall was born in Toronto, Canada West, to English parents. Raised in Minneapolis, Minnesota, he first performed in blackface in a school fundraiser. At age 17, he had his first paid performance in Minneapolis. Soon after, he left to begin his career in acting and singing.

Wall worked as an entertainer for the next 46 years. He was an actor, singer, blackface comedian, and vaudeville entertainer. He performed throughout the United States, but especially in the American South. He performed with Lew Dockstader, George Primrose, Al G. Field, and for the Gus Hill and George Evans Minstrel company. Wall formed a partnership with Dan Quinlan named the Quinlan and Wall Imperial Minstrels, which performed in all of the Southern states. Considered one of the best minstrels in the United States, Wall wrote his own songs and composed his own music.

In 1927, Wall lived in Saint Louis, Missouri with a relative. In May 1927, he traveled to Lexington, Kentucky, to play the horse races. Wall committed suicide in a Lexington hotel by shooting himself in the head. Wall was buried in Calvary Cemetery in Saint Louis.
