= St. Louis crime family =

Italian-American Mafia crime family in Missouri, US

- Founded: c. 1890s
- Founding location: St. Louis, Missouri, United States
- Years active: c. 1890s–2014
- Territory: Primarily Greater St. Louis, with additional territory throughout Missouri, as well as Las Vegas
- Ethnicity: Italians as "made men" and other ethnicities as associates
- Activities: Racketeering, gambling, bookmaking, loansharking, extortion, drug trafficking, bootlegging, robbery, skimming, bribery, assault, and murder
- Allies: Chicago Outfit; Cleveland crime family; Colorado crime family; Detroit Partnership; Kansas City crime family
- Rivals: Various gangs in the St. Louis area

The St. Louis crime family, also known as the Giordano crime family or the St. Louis Mafia, was an Italian-American Mafia crime family based in St. Louis, Missouri.

== History ==
=== Early Italian gangs ===
The earliest records are of the Italian Mafia gangs in the mid-1890s. By the early 1910s, Dominick Giambrone was recognized as the local Mafia boss until 1924, when he stepped down and fled the city. With the passage of Prohibition in 1920, control of St. Louis's illegal bootlegging operations became a major power struggle between the seven different ethnic gangs: the Green Ones, the Pillow Gang, the Russo Gang, the Egan's Rats, the Hogan Gang, the Shelton Gang and the Cuckoos all fighting to control illegal rackets in the St. Louis area.

The Green Ones was a Sicilian gang, formed in 1915, by Vito Giannola, his brother John Giannola and Alphonse Palizzola before immigrating to America. After the three men arrived in America they went their separate ways: Vito Giannola to St. Louis, John Giannola to Chicago and Alphonse Palizzola to Springfield, Illinois. During the early 1920s, Vito Giannola reunited with his brother John Giannola and Alphonse Palizzola in St. Louis. The three men imposed a tax on all goods sold in the city's Italian community. In 1924, Vito Giannola became the most powerful Mafia boss in St. Louis forcing Dominick Giambrone to flee the city. Giannola attempted to take control of the bootlegging rackets in the area and fought with members of the Egan's Rats gang and Cuckoos Gang. On September 9, 1927, Alphonse Palizzola was shot and killed by a rival gang. Months later boss Vito Giannola was shot 37 times to death on December 28, 1927. The remaining members of the Green Ones gang including John Giannola went into hiding.

The Pillow gang was the earliest Italian gang in the city being active since 1910. The gang was led by Pasquale Santino until 1927, when he was murdered. Carmelo Fresina became the new leader, nicknaming it the Pillow gang because Fresina carried a pillow with him to sit on after he had been shot in the buttocks. Fresina formed an alliance with splinter group of the Green Ones called the Russo gang led by Tony Russo. The two gangs battled with the Green Ones until 1928, when the Russo gang lost too many members and blamed the Pillow gang for betraying them. In 1931, Fresina was murdered and members of the Pillow gang continued fighting with the Russo gang and the Green Ones.

The Pillow gang was taken over Thomas Buffa, who became boss of the St. Louis Mafia family. The rival gangs continued fighting until the end of Prohibition, when the various Mafia factions began functioning as one family. In 1943, Buffa fled the city and was murdered in 1947 in Lodi, California. After Buffa's murder leadership of the family went to Tony Lopiparo, Frank Coppola, and Ralph Caleca.

=== Giordano and the Detroit family ===
After Tony Lopiparo's death, Anthony Giordano became boss and declared independence from the Kansas City crime family. In the 1970s, Giordano, along with Detroit mobsters Anthony Joseph Zerilli and Michael Polizzi, attempted to gain control of the Frontier Hotel and Casino in Las Vegas. They failed and all three men were convicted of conspiracy. In 1975, Giordano was sent to prison, his nephew Vincenzo Giammanco became the acting boss until Giordano was released in December 1977. On August 29, 1980, Giordano died from cancer in his St. Louis home.

=== Current status ===
The St. Louis crime family has avoided local and federal authorities, who have been focused on organized crime that inflicts public violence. Anthony "Nino" Parrino served as boss from 1997 to his death on November 3, 2014. The last known underboss was Joseph Cammarata.

== Historical leadership ==
=== Boss (official and acting) ===
- 1912-1923 — Dominick Giambrone — fled; later murdered in 1934
- 1923-1927 — Vito Giannola
- 1927-1937 — Frank Agrusa — born in Cinisi, Sicily, Italy
- 1937-1943 — Thomas Buffa
- 1943-1950 — Pasquale Miceli
- 1950-1960 — Anthony "Tony Lap" Lopiparo — the son of a St. Louis mobster; died in 1960
- 1960-1980 — Anthony "Tony G." Giordano — as boss he declared independence from the Kansas City family. Imprisoned 1975–1977; died of cancer on August 29, 1980
  - Acting 1975-1977 — Vincenzo "Jimmy" Giammanco — Giordano's nephew
- 1980-1982 — John "Johnny V." Vitale. — died on June 5, 1982
- 1982-1997 — Matthew "Mike" Trupiano Jr. — Giordano's nephew from Detroit; died in 1997
- 1997–2014 — Anthony "Nino" Parrino — died on November 3, 2014

=== Underboss ===
- 1912-1923 — Vito Giannola — became boss
- 1923-1927 — Alfonse Palazzolo — murdered
- 1927-1937 — Thomas Buffa — became boss
- 1937-1943 — Pasquale Miceli — became boss
- 1943-1950 — Vincent Chiapetta – demoted
- 1950-1980 — John "Johnny V." Vitale — semi-retired from 1960; later became boss
- 1980-2013 — Joseph "Uncle Joe" Cammarata — became semi-retired in the 2000s; died in 2013

== Former members ==
- Fernando M. "Nondo" Bartolotta (born on April 13, 1957) — soldier. Bartolotta was born in St. Louis, and his family hailed from Palermo. According to information by Richard Beck, a trial witness, he identified Bartolotta as an associate of the St. Louis family by October 1979, and was inducted into the family by 1982. In July 1984, he was indicted for illegal gambling. In December 1984, he was arrested for conspiring to steal $300,000 from a store, and in April 1985, he was sentenced to 5 years in prison. In late 1985, he was sentenced to 6 years in prison for illegal gambling and fraud, he was released in 1991. By 1992, Bartolotta began a crime wave, including robbing a bank in Missouri, burglarising a home in Chicago and had attempted to rob an armoured car. In March 1997, he was sentenced to 220 months for threats of violence, involvement in stolen property and bank robbery, he was released in March 2006. In December 2009, he was placed to the Missouri Gaming Commission's exclusion list.
- Vincent Filipello — born in 1910. Filippello was identified as a soldier in the St. Louis family in 1978 whilst Anthony Giordano served as the boss of the family. In March 1967, Filippello was arrested in connection of a $83,000 bank robbery in Peoria, Illinois. He died in 1996 at the age of 86.
- Ralph Caleca — born in 1900. Caleca was identified as a soldier for the St. Louis family in 1978. According to the testimony of a government official in April 1959, Caleca, along with Anthony Giordano and Anthony Lopiparo, were accused of smuggling heroin into the United States from Canada since at least the early 1950s, Caleca pleaded guilty to conspiring to evade federal income taxes and he was given a 3-year prison sentence along with a $2500 fine. According to law enforcement and government officials, Caleca was heavily involved in the vending machine business along with Jack Joseph and John Vitale. He died in 1988 at the age of 88.
- Frank Pisciotta — born in 1892. Pisciotta was identified as a soldier for the St. Louis family in 1978. He died in 1990 at the age of 98.
- Vito Cusumano — born in 1922. Cusumano was identified as a soldier for the St. Louis family in 1978. Cusumano was credited to the August 1951 murder of Joseph "Joe" Bommarito, which he denied. He died in 1982 at the age of 59.
- Dominic Biondo — unknown date of birth or time of deceased. During the 1960s, Biondo was a known bookmaker and associate of the St. Louis family, and by 1978, he was identified as a soldier for the crime family. During the 1970s, Biondo was sentenced to 5 years in prison for extortion.
- Matthew "Mike" Trupiano Jr. (born on November 8, 1938) — former boss. Trupiano was born in Detroit, and his family hailed from Palermo. In March 1965, Trupiano was arrested for illegal gambling. In June 1967, he was arrested for impersonating a state official's license plate. In February 1968, he was arrested for burglary and resisting arrest. In October 1968, he was arrested for possession of a handgun. In November 1970, he was arrested for illegal gambling. In around 1972 or 1973, he was the President of LIUNA Local 110. By 1979, he was identified as a member of the St. Louis family. In 1980, he was ordered to be killed by a Syrian crime syndicate, however he was never harmed. According to the information from witness, Richard Beck, Trupiano was inducted as a member of the St. Louis family, along with Fernando "Nondo" Bartolotta, the ceremony was allegedly held at a pizzeria in St. Charles. It is believed that he was promoted to the position of boss by 1983. In July 1984, he was indicted for illegal gambling. In November 1985, he was indicted for the extortion of massage parlours and nightclubs. In 1986, he had married Marlene Daly. In May 1986, he was sentenced to 4 years in prison for illegal gambling with 5 years of probation and a fine of $30,000, he was released in December 1988. In December 1991, he was under indictment for fraud and illegal gambling. In January 1993, he was sentenced to 30 months in prison and was released in April 1995. He died in October 1997.
- James Giammanco (born on September 1, 1920) — former capo. Giammanco was born in St. Louis, and his family hailed from Palermo. In July 1940, Giammanco was first arrested for liquor violation, and he was sentenced to 18 months in prison. In November 1942, he had enlisted in the U.S. military and was discharged in April 1944. In September 1945, he was arrested on an unknown charge and was released the next day. In December 1955, he was arrested for larceny and was released two days after. In February 1956, Giammanco was arrested for murder, however he was released. It is suspected that Giammanco became a member of the St. Louis family by the late 1950s. In April 1957, he was arrested for liquor violation. In October 1960, in September 1961 and again in February 1964, he was arrested for burglary. In June 1965, Giammanco attended the wedding of Detroit family member, Jackie Giacalone. In October 1966, he was arrested for illegal gambling. In January 1967, he was arrested for arson. It is believed Giammanco became a capo for the family by the late 1960s. In July 1967, he was arrested for illegal gambling. According to informants, Giammanco served as a messenger between the St. Louis and Detroit families and was also alleged to have been close to Kansas City family member, Anthony Civella. Giammanco was arrested twice in November 1967 for illegal gambling and burglary. In February 1968, he was arrested for illegal gambling. By 1970, Giammanco was affiliated with William Spinelli, Anthony "Nino" Parrino and John Vitale. In 1971, Giammanco was involved in the alleged attempted extortion of Las Vegas-Flamingo Hotel employee, Primo "Larry" Caudera, in between of September and October 1971, Caudera was kidnapped and murdered, in October 1971, Giammanco was arrested for the murder, along with Tony Giordano, John Vitale and Ralph Caleca. By the late 1970s, he was the President of BGG Corporation based in Fairmont City. He died in November 1985.

== List of murders committed by the St. Louis crime family ==
Name	Date	Reason
Salvatore Leoni	January 19, 1912	It is believed Leoni was beheaded by Dominick Giambrone as Leoni was set to testify against Antonio Sansone for murder.
Vincent Butera	February 14, 1917	Butera was hacked to death inside of his saloon located at 901 Biddle Street in St. Louis as he was warned by Dominick Giambrone to close his business.
Ohmer Hockett and John Balke	February 4,1926	Hockett was a police officer from Edwardsville, Illinois. They were found February 5, 1926 in a shallow grave near Horseshoe Lake, east of Madison County Illinois-apparently slain by bootleggers after visiting a still at Horseshoe lake. Both had been shot once below the left eye. Crime boss John Ginnola was questioned in regard to the murders; he died January 5,1938 of natural causes.
Anthony F Russo & Vincent Spicuzza	August 9, 1927	Russo and Spicuzza were shot and killed by Alphonse Palazzolo and Frank Agrusa. Palazzolo had attempted to frame Jack McGurn for the Russo and Spicuzza murders.
Benny Giamanco & Aloys Beelman	August 24, 1927	Beelman was a lawyer and an innocent bystander. Giamanco was a friend of Anthony Russo and Vincent Spicuzza, who were both killed on August 9, 1927.
Alphonse Palazzolo	September 9, 1927	Palazzolo was shot and killed at the age of 34. Palazzolo was killed as part of a bootleg war in St. Louis.
Charles Palmisano	November 10, 1927	Palmisano was murdered at the age of 49 for refusing to pay protection to the St. Louis family following the death of Alphonse Palazzolo.
Mike Palazzolo	May 1934	Palazzolo was shot in the head and neck as it was believed he had feuded with Walter Mushenick, an associate of the family.
Dominick Giambrone	July 9, 1934	Giambrone had served as the boss of the St. Louis family from between 1912 and 1923. Giambrone had fled St. Louis and returned in April 1934, and was killed at the age of 58 in July 1934.
Gaetano "Thomas" Buffa	March 27, 1946	During the 1940s, Buffa was appointed by the administration of the St. Louis family to oversee the rackets in St. Louis along with Tony Lopiparo. Buffa was killed at the age of 59, for testifying against the girlfriend of a member of the St. Louis family.
Joseph "Joe" Bommarito	August 26, 1951	Bommarito was shot and killed by Vito Cusumano as Bommarito had attempted to set up a rival produce hauling firm.
George "Stormy" Harvill	January 21, 1966	Harvill was shot and killed in St. Clair County, Illinois as he had attempted to seize control of Laborers' Local 42, St. Louis.
Primo Frank "Larry" Caudera	October 2, 1971	Caudera operated several clubs from St. Louis to Las Vegas. Caudera was shot 6 times and killed, he was found in the trunk of his Cadillac vehicle in South St. Louis. On the 13th of October 1971, law enforcement arrested Anthony Giardano, John Vitale and James Giammanco, and charged them with the murder of Caudera.
John Paul Spica	November 9, 1979	Spica was an associate of Anthony Giordano, the boss of the St. Louis family at the time. Spica was also considered as a suspect in the April 1968 murder of Martin Luther King Jr. Spica was killed in a car bomb in his Cadillac vehicle.
Frank Parrino	July 31, 1994	Parrino was shot and killed at the age of 61, by Joseph Monti.

== See also ==
- Crime in Missouri
- List of Italian Mafia crime families
- The Hill, St. Louis
