= Orbital Debris Co-ordination Working Group =

Space organization

The Orbital Debris Co-ordination Working Group (ODCWG) is one of the working groups of the International Organization for Standardization's Technical Committee 20/Subcommittee 14 TC20/SC14 "Spacecraft Systems and Operations".

== History ==
The Orbital Debris Co-ordination Working Group was formed by unanimous agreement at the May 2003 Plenary meeting of TC20/SC14.

== Description ==
The ODCWG recognizes that the mitigation of orbital space debris is an international concern, thus international, comprehensive and cohesive standards (namely ISO TC20/SC14) must be adopted to address the issue.

Currently six standards projects are in development, and a further seven project proposals are being prepared. The first debris mitigation standards were expected in 2008, with more International Standards, technical specifications or technical reports expected to be published through to 2011–2012.

== See also ==
- Inter-Agency Space Debris Coordination Committee
