= Catcher's Mitt =

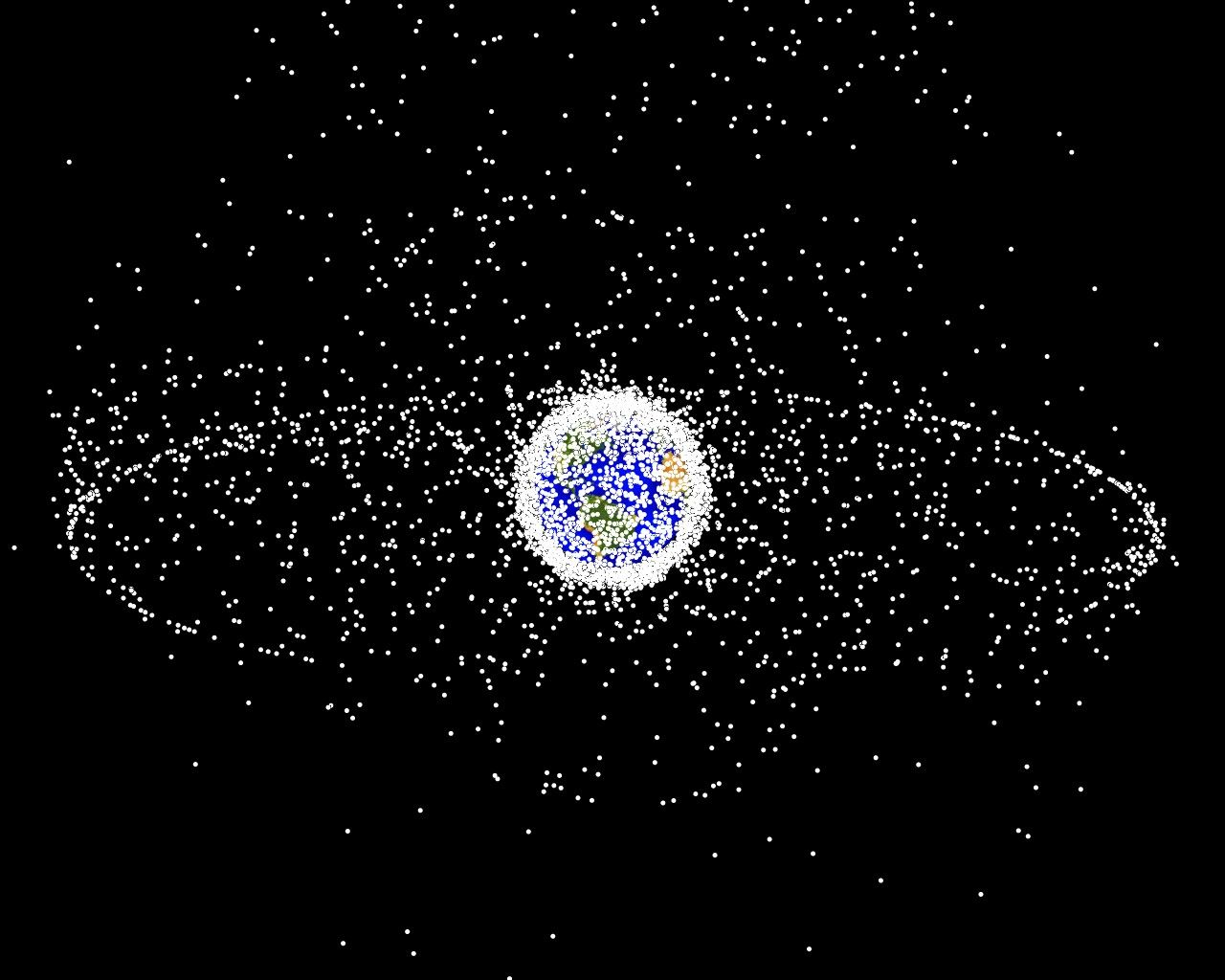
The above image is a computer generated image of objects in Earth orbit that are currently being tracked. Approximately 95% of the objects in this illustration are orbital debris, i.e., not functional satellites. The dots represent the current location of each item. The orbital debris dots are scaled according to the image size of the graphic to optimize their visibility and are not scaled to Earth.

Catcher's Mitt is the name of a study conducted (beginning in 2009) by the United States Defense Advanced Research Projects Agency (DARPA) to "better understand the issues and challenges involved with removing man-made debris from earth orbit." DARPA's goal was to use the study to determine both if DARPA should invest more resources in orbital debris removal and, if so, how to best do so.

== History ==
The study consisted of three primary aspects; an open Request for Information (RFI), an International Conference, and a series of utility studies conducted by DARPA, NASA, and the United States Air Force.

=== Request for Information ===
On 17 September 2009, DARPA released a public Request for Information (RFI) through the Federal Business Opportunities website. The RFI called for possible technical approaches to removing a wide range of low Earth Orbit (LEO) and Geosynchronous Earth Orbit (GEO) debris. The request looked for system level concepts that addressed several issues, including "Physics-based approaches to debris removal as a system level solution", "The response time of the removal concept", and "An estimate of an economic metric (e.g. $/kg removed or $/particle removed)". The solicitation period ended on 30 October 2009. The ASTROS concept was published the following August in Popular Science Magazine. Using Adhesive Synthetic Trash Recovery Orbital Spheres, presented at the conference by Sean Shepherd.

=== International Conference on Orbital Debris Removal ===
DARPA and NASA hosted the International Conference on Orbital Debris Removal December 8-10 2009 near DARPA headquarters in Chantilly, Virginia. Topics discussed at the conference ranged from tracking and predicting orbital debris to exotic removal techniques such as using tethers or solar sails to move debris to less populated orbits. The keynote speakers included both NASA and European Space Agency (ESA) program heads. While the conference addressed technical issues (what the earlier RFI focused on), the conference also considered wider concerns, like economic and legal issues.

== See also ==
- Orbital Debris Co-ordination Working Group

== External references ==
Catcher's Mitt Final Report (2011)
