= List of United States federal courthouses in Louisiana =

Following is a list of current and former courthouses of the United States federal court system located in Louisiana. Each entry indicates the name of the building along with an image, if available, its location and the jurisdiction it covers, the dates during which it was used for each such jurisdiction, and, if applicable the person for whom it was named, and the date of renaming. Dates of use will not necessarily correspond with the dates of construction or demolition of a building, as pre-existing structures may be adapted or court use, and former court buildings may later be put to other uses. Also, the official name of the building may be changed at some point after its use as a federal court building has been initiated.

== Courthouses ==
Courthouse	City	Image	Street address	Jurisdiction	Dates of use	Named for
U.S. Post Office & Court House	Alexandria		Johnson Street, between 3rd & 4th	W.D.La.	1896–1933; Razed in 1933	n/a
U.S. Post Office & Court House^{†}	Alexandria		515 Murray Street	W.D.La.	1933–present	n/a
U.S. Post Office & Court House†	Baton Rouge		355 North Boulevard	E.D.La.	1897–1933; Now the City Club of Baton Rouge.	n/a
U.S. Post Office & Court House^{†}	Baton Rouge		707 Florida Street	E.D.La. M.D.La.	1933–present	n/a
Russell B. Long Federal Building and Courthouse	Baton Rouge		777 Florida Street	M.D.La.	1993–present	Russell B. Long
U.S. Post Office & Court House	Lake Charles		501 Broad Street	W.D.La.	1912–c. 1960; Now privately owned.	n/a
U.S. Post Office & Federal Bldg	Lake Charles		921 Moss Street	?	1960–1994; Still in use as a post office.	n/a
Edwin F. Hunter, Jr. U.S. Courthouse and Federal Building	Lake Charles		611 Broad Street	W.D.La.	?–present	District Court judge Edwin F. Hunter, Jr.
Federal Building and U.S. Courthouse	Lafayette		705 Jefferson Street	W.D.La.	1958–?	n/a
John M. Shaw U.S. Courthouse	Lafayette		800 Lafayette Street	W.D.La.	?–present	John Malach Shaw
U.S. Court House & Post Office	Monroe		St. John & Grammond Sts.	W.D.La.	1892–1933; Razed in 1965.	n/a
U.S. Post Office & Court House	Monroe		201 Jackson Street	W.D.La.	1934–present	n/a
U.S. Custom House†	New Orleans		423 Canal Street	E.D.La. 5th Cir.	1860–1915; 1891–1915 2008–2020 Audubon Insectarium (An Audubon Nature Institute museum). Now offices of U.S. Department of Homeland Security.	n/a
John Minor Wisdom U.S. Courthouse†	New Orleans		600 Camp Street	E.D.La. 5th Cir.	1915–1963; 1915–present	Court of Appeals judge John Minor Wisdom (1994)
Hale Boggs Federal Building and U.S. Courthouse	New Orleans		500 Poydras Street	E.D.La.	1962–present	Hale Boggs
U.S. Court House & Post Office†	Opelousas		162 South Court Street	W.D.La.	1891–1967; Now privately owned.	n/a
U.S. Post Office & Court House	Shreveport		NE corner Texas & Marshall	W.D.La.	1887–1910; Razed in 1910.	n/a
U.S. Post Office & Court House^{†}	Shreveport		424 Texas Street	W.D.La.	1912–1974; Now a branch of the Shreve Memorial Library.	n/a
Joe D. Waggoner Federal Building	Shreveport		500 Fannin Street	W.D.La.	1974–1994	Joe Waggonner
Tom Stagg Federal Building and U.S. Courthouse	Shreveport		300 Fannin Street	W.D.La.	1993–present	Tom Stagg

== Key ==
^{†}	Listed on the National Register of Historic Places (NRHP)
^{††}	NRHP-listed and also designated as a National Historic Landmark
