= Interstate 110 (Louisiana) =

Highway in Louisiana

Interstate 110
- Martin Luther King Jr. Expressway
- I-110 highlighted in red

Route information
- Auxiliary route of I-10
- Maintained by Louisiana DOTD
- Length: 9.056 mi (Note: For the federal government's purposes, the Federal Highway Administration lists I-110 as 8.89 miles (14.31 km) in length.) (14.574 km)
- Existed: 1965–present
- Tourist routes: National Scenic Byways: Great River Road
- NHS: Entire route

Major junctions
- South end: I-10 in Baton Rouge
- US 61 / US 190 in Baton Rouge
- North end: US 61 in Baton Rouge

Location
- Country: United States
- State: Louisiana
- Parishes: East Baton Rouge

Highway system
- Interstate Highway System; Main; Auxiliary; Suffixed; Business; Future; Louisiana State Highway System; Interstate; US; State; Scenic
← LA 109	→ LA 110
← LA 3021	LA 3022	→ LA 3023

Interstate 110 (I-110) is an auxiliary Interstate Highway in the U.S. state of Louisiana. It runs 9.06 miles (14.58 km) in a north–south direction as a spur of I-10 in the city of Baton Rouge.

The route branches off of I-10 just east of the Horace Wilkinson Bridge across the Mississippi River and travels along an elevated alignment between the city's downtown area and Mid City neighborhood. The interstate then makes two 90-degree turns, the first occurring in front of the Governor's Mansion a few blocks east of the State Capitol. In the northern portion of the city, I-110 engages in a stack interchange with the concurrent U.S. Routes 61 (US 61) and 190 (US 190, Airline Highway) and passes just west of the Baton Rouge Metropolitan Airport. The highway terminates as traffic merges onto US 61 (Scenic Highway) in an area known as Scotlandville.

I-110 began as a short section of independent freeway near the downtown area originally known as the Baton Rouge Expressway. It opened to traffic in 1957 and served as part of US 61/190 Bus. until 1960. At this time, the route was incorporated into the Interstate Highway System as I-410 and was intended as part of a northern bypass of I-10 utilizing the existing Mississippi River Bridge on US 190. This project was cancelled in the mid-1960s, and the highway was instead utilized as a spur and renumbered as I-110. The highway was then extended northward in stages until its completion near Southern University in 1984. In 1999, the Louisiana legislature designated I-110 as the Martin Luther King Jr. Expressway.

== Route description ==
From the south, I-110 begins at a three leg directional interchange with I-10 at exit 155B. I-10 branches west from this junction across the Mississippi River via the Horace Wilkinson Bridge and southeast toward the city of New Orleans. I-110 heads north as an elevated six-lane freeway, dividing the downtown and Mid City areas of Baton Rouge. A number of closely spaced and overlapping interchanges provide access to surface streets below, including: exit 1A to LA 73 (Government Street); 1B to Convention Street; 1C to US 61/190 Bus. (Florida Street); 1D to North Street; and 1H to Laurel Street. Most of the above are left exits favoring northbound traffic.

I-110 briefly passes through the Spanish Town neighborhood as it descends to grade and bends sharply due east in front of the Governor's Mansion. Here, exit 1E connects with LA 3045 (Capitol Access Road), leading to the State Capitol, Capitol Park, Old Arsenal Museum, and Louisiana Department of Transportation and Development headquarters. The highway then passes the BREC Memorial Sports Complex, accessed via exit 1F to Fuqua Street, and has partial interchanges with Scenic Highway (2A) and LA 67/North 22nd Street (2B). After curving back to the north, I-110 elevates again and travels for three miles (4.8 km) through a residential neighborhood located just east of a large industrial area. Tight diamond interchanges during this stretch provide access to Chippewa Street (exit 3A), Mohican Street and Wyandotte Street/Weller Avenue (3B), Evangeline Street (4), and Hollywood Street (5A).

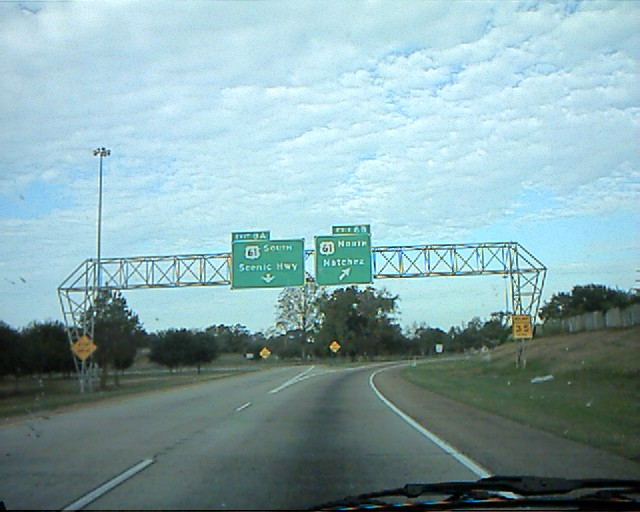
Interchange marking the northern terminus of I-110

I-110 then engages into a stack interchange (exit 5B) with the concurrent US 61/US 190 (Airline Highway), which sweeps around the northeast side of town and crosses the Mississippi River en route to Opelousas. Immediately to the north, exit 6 to LA 408 (Harding Boulevard) provides access to Baton Rouge Metropolitan Airport and Southern University. Curving westward, I-110 skirts the Scotlandville area and has a half diamond interchange with LA 19 at exit 8A, connecting with the nearby suburb of Baker. Soon afterward, I-110 reaches its northern terminus at a junction with US 61 (Scenic Highway), which heads north toward St. Francisville and Natchez, Mississippi.

=== Route classification and data ===
I-110 is classified as an urban interstate by the Louisiana Department of Transportation and Development (La DOTD). Daily traffic volume in 2013 peaked at 85,500 vehicles at the I-10 interchange and tapered off to 25,300 vehicles toward the northern terminus. The posted speed limit is 50 mph (80 km/h) through the downtown area, after which it increases to 60 mph (95 km/h) for the remainder of the route.

The portion of I-110 north of the Capitol Access Road exit is a small part of the ten-state National Scenic Byway known as the Great River Road.

== History ==
=== Baton Rouge Expressway ===
The genesis of the present I-110 was a short stretch of freeway constructed in the mid-1950s called the Baton Rouge Expressway. The first section extended roughly one mile (1.6 km) between Boyd Avenue (now Spanish Town Road) and Plank Road. Traffic was fed onto the expressway from the downtown area via the one-way couplet of North 9th and 10th Streets, a continuation of the divided thoroughfare of East Boulevard. The expressway was not initially constructed as part of the Interstate Highway System, although the Louisiana Department of Highways designed it for future inclusion. It was given the internal designation of LA 3022 and also served as part of US 61/190 Bus. from its opening on August 20, 1957 until 1960.

=== Interstate 410 ===
In 1960, US 61/190 Bus. was moved onto its present route, and the Baton Rouge Expressway became part of the newly designated I-410. By 1963, the expressway was extended south to Government Street. The connections to I-10 were made when the adjoining sections of that highway were completed eastbound to Perkins Road in September 1964 and westbound across the Mississippi River in April 1968.

I-410 was intended as a northern beltway extending from I-10 west of Port Allen, crossing the Mississippi River via the existing Huey P. Long Bridge on US 190, and then traveling along the present route of I-110 southward to rejoin I-10. This plan was scrapped around 1965, and the Baton Rouge Expressway was renumbered as I-110 to reflect its function as a north–south spur.

=== Renumbering and extensions ===
Further northern extensions of I-110 were opened as follows: from LA 67 (Plank Road) to Hollywood Drive around 1969, to US 61/190 (Airline Highway) in 1976, to LA 408 (Harding Boulevard) in the late 1970s, and to LA 19 around 1982. The final segment between LA 19 and US 61 (Scenic Highway) in Scotlandville was completed in January 1984. In total, I-110 was constructed over the course of 30 years at a cost of $94.8 million.

=== Naming controversy ===
In 1991, three separate parties advocated for the naming of a Baton Rouge-area thoroughfare after civil rights activist, Martin Luther King Jr. The most high-profile effort was by state Senator Cleo Fields, who stated that the city was the only major metropolitan area in Louisiana without a street named for King. Fields chose the northern portion of I-110 traversing the historically black community of Scotlandville for the designation. The other parties, which included the local NAACP and a group known as People for a Change, criticized Fields' choice of thoroughfare and also bickered among themselves about the issue.

The proposal also met with strong opposition from the outside, including Louisiana House of Representatives member and then-gubernatorial candidate David Duke, who opposed naming any street for King, stating that his "reputation as a womanizer means the honor is an insult to women and family life." Representatives from the Taxpayer Education Association of Louisiana, the Louisiana Coalition for Conservatism, and the National Association for the Advancement of White People likewise brought up allegations of widespread plagiarism in King's writings and his ties to Communism.

Nevertheless, the bill was signed into law that year by Governor Buddy Roemer, designating I-110 as the Martin Luther King Jr. Expressway. Signs bearing the name were not installed along the highway until June 1999.

== Exit list ==
The entire highway is in Baton Rouge, East Baton Rouge Parish.

mi	km	Exit	Destinations	Notes
0.000– 0.521	0.000– 0.838	1I–J-K	I-10 / Terrace Street – Lafayette, New Orleans	Southern terminus; signed as exit 1K to I-10 east, 1I to I-10 west, and 1J to Terrace Street; exit 155B on I-10
0.222– 0.774	0.357– 1.246	1A	LA 73 (Government Street) – River Center, Downtown	
0.587– 1.102	0.945– 1.773	1B	Convention Street – Downtown	No southbound exit
0.774– 0.797	1.246– 1.283	1C	US 61 Bus. / US 190 Bus. (Florida Street) – Downtown	Northbound exit and southbound entrance connecting with eastbound Florida Street
0.896– 0.965	1.442– 1.553	1D	North Street – Capitol Park, Downtown	Northbound exit to North Street, southbound entrance from Main Street
1.250– 1.329	2.012– 2.139	1H	Laurel Street – Downtown	Northbound entrance from Main Street, southbound exit to Laurel Street
1.250– 1.750	2.012– 2.816	1E	LA 3045 (Capitol Access Road) – Capitol Park	To La DOTD main headquarters
1.605– 1.657	2.583– 2.667	1G	North Ninth Street – Capitol Park, Downtown	Northbound entrance from North 10th Street, southbound exit to North 9th Street
1.926– 1.945	3.100– 3.130	1F	Fuqua Street – Memorial Stadium	Northbound exit and southbound entrance
1.945– 2.137	3.130– 3.439	2A	Scenic Highway	Northbound exit and southbound entrance connecting with northbound Scenic Highway (unsigned LA 3164)
2.229– 2.780	3.587– 4.474	2B	LA 67 south (North 22nd Street) – Memorial Stadium	No northbound exit (accessed via exit 2A)
3.005– 3.558	4.836– 5.726	3A	Chippewa Street	
3.698– 4.406	5.951– 7.091	3B	Wyandotte Street (northbound) / Weller Avenue (southbound), Mohican Street	Wyandotte Street signed northbound only, Weller Avenue signed southbound only
4.407– 4.992	7.092– 8.034	4	Evangeline Street	
4.980– 5.010	8.015– 8.063	5A	Hollywood Street	Northbound exit and southbound entrance
5.489– 6.744	8.834– 10.853	5B	US 61 / US 190 (Airline Highway) – Opelousas	
6.045– 7.098	9.728– 11.423	6	LA 408 (Harding Boulevard) – Southern University, Metro Airport	
7.899– 7.915	12.712– 12.738	8A	LA 19 – Scotlandville, Baker	Northbound exit and southbound entrance
8.666– 9.056	13.947– 14.574	8B–C	US 61 (Scenic Highway) – St. Francisville, Natchez	Northern terminus; signed as exit 8B to US 61 south and 8C to US 61 north
1.000 mi = 1.609 km; 1.000 km = 0.621 mi: Incomplete access
