= City Park Golf Course =

Golf course in Baton Rouge, Louisiana, US

- U.S. National Register of Historic Places
- U.S. Historic district
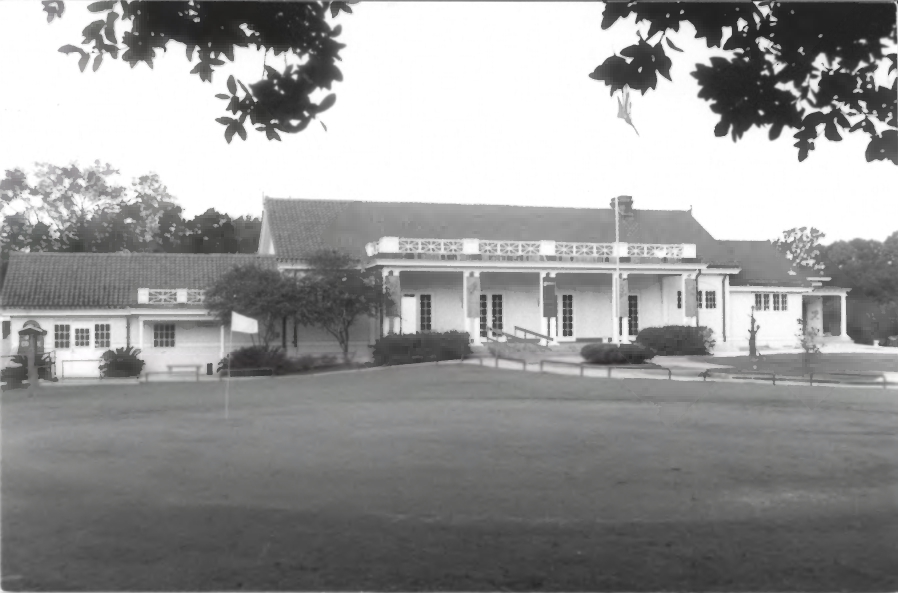

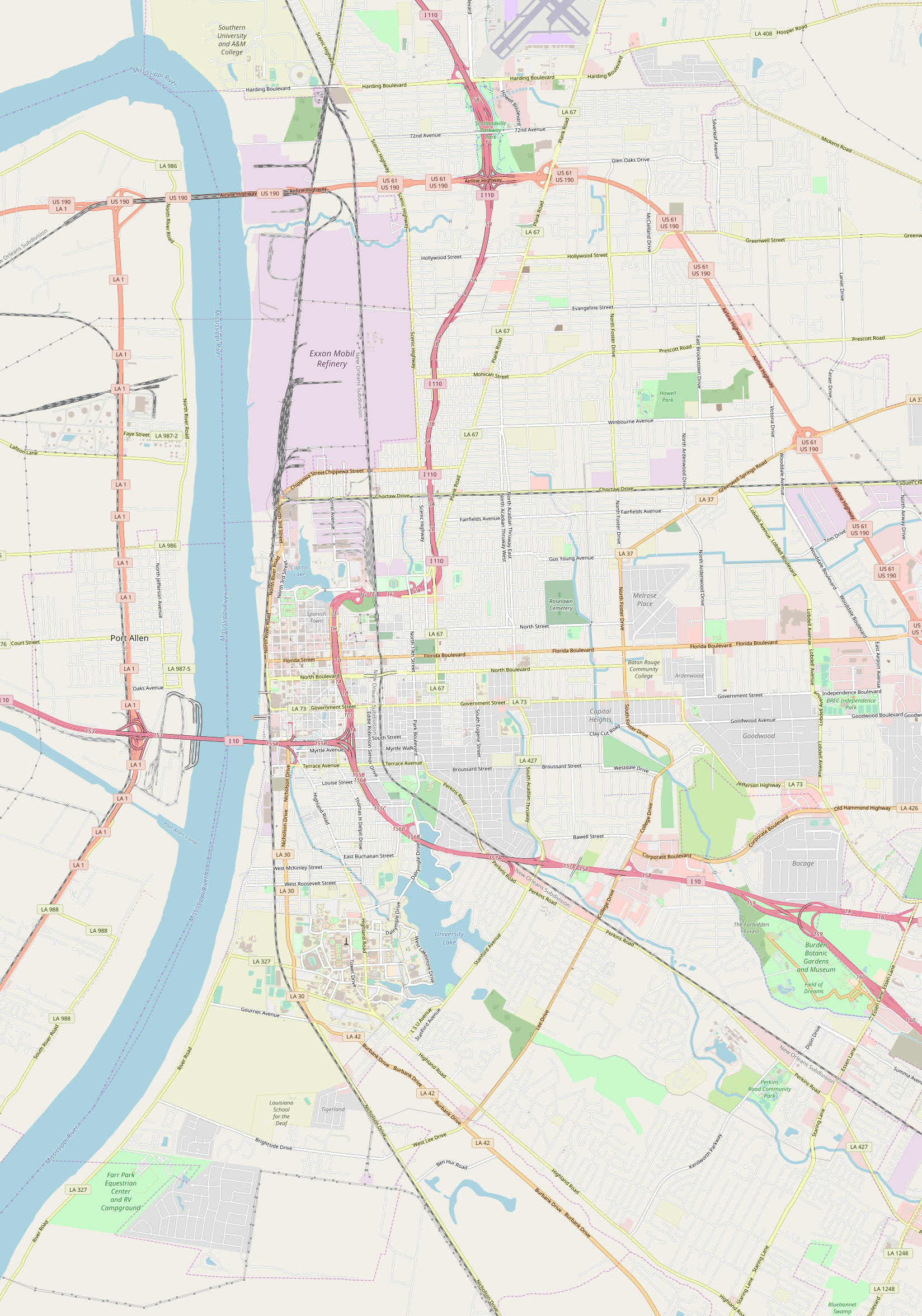
- Location within Baton Rouge
- Location: 1442 City Park Avenue, Baton Rouge, Louisiana
- Coordinates: 30°25′54″N 91°10′03″W
- Area: 48 acres (19 ha)
- Built: 1928
- Architect: Tom Bendelow; L.A. Grosz
- Architectural style: Colonial Revival
- NRHP reference No.: 02001546
- Added to NRHP: December 20, 2002

City Park Golf Course is a public golf course in Baton Rouge, Louisiana, and was the first public golf course and the city's only public course until the mid-1950s. The short, 34-par, nine-hole course was completed in 1926 and officially opened in 1928.

The historic 48 acres (19 ha) area comprising the golf course, the clubhouse and the old pump house, was listed on the National Register of Historic Places in 2002.

== See also ==
- National Register of Historic Places listings in East Baton Rouge Parish, Louisiana
