= Main Street Historic District (Baton Rouge, Louisiana) =

Historic district in Louisiana, United States

- U.S. National Register of Historic Places
- U.S. Historic district
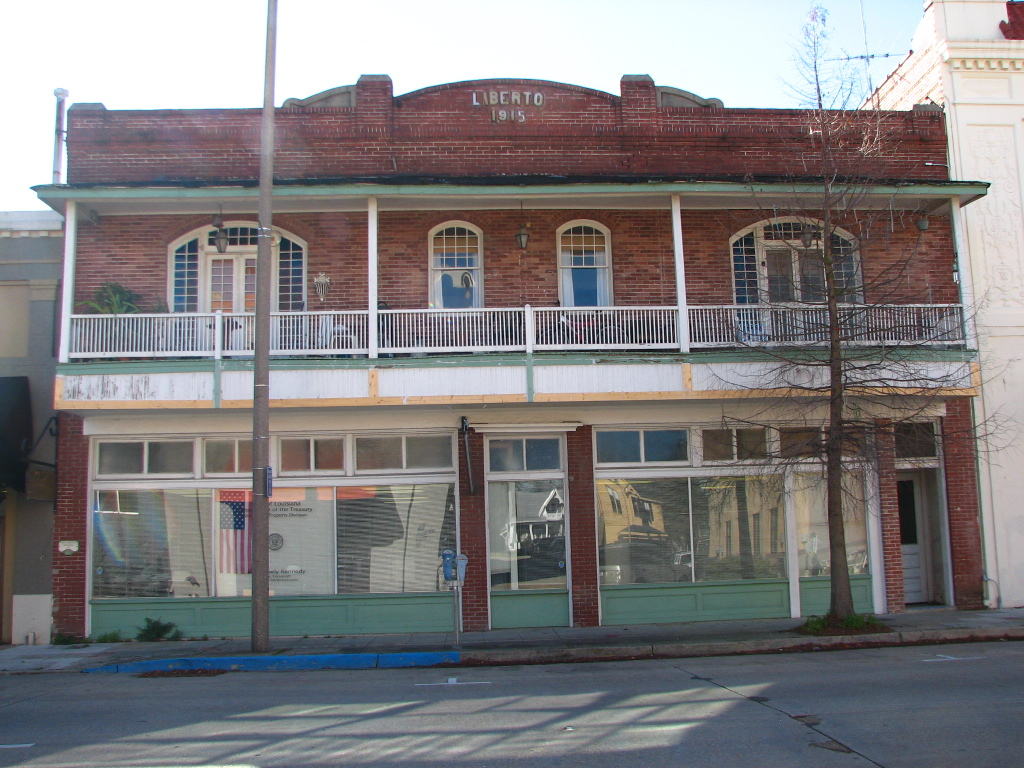
- Liberto Building at 624-626 Main Street

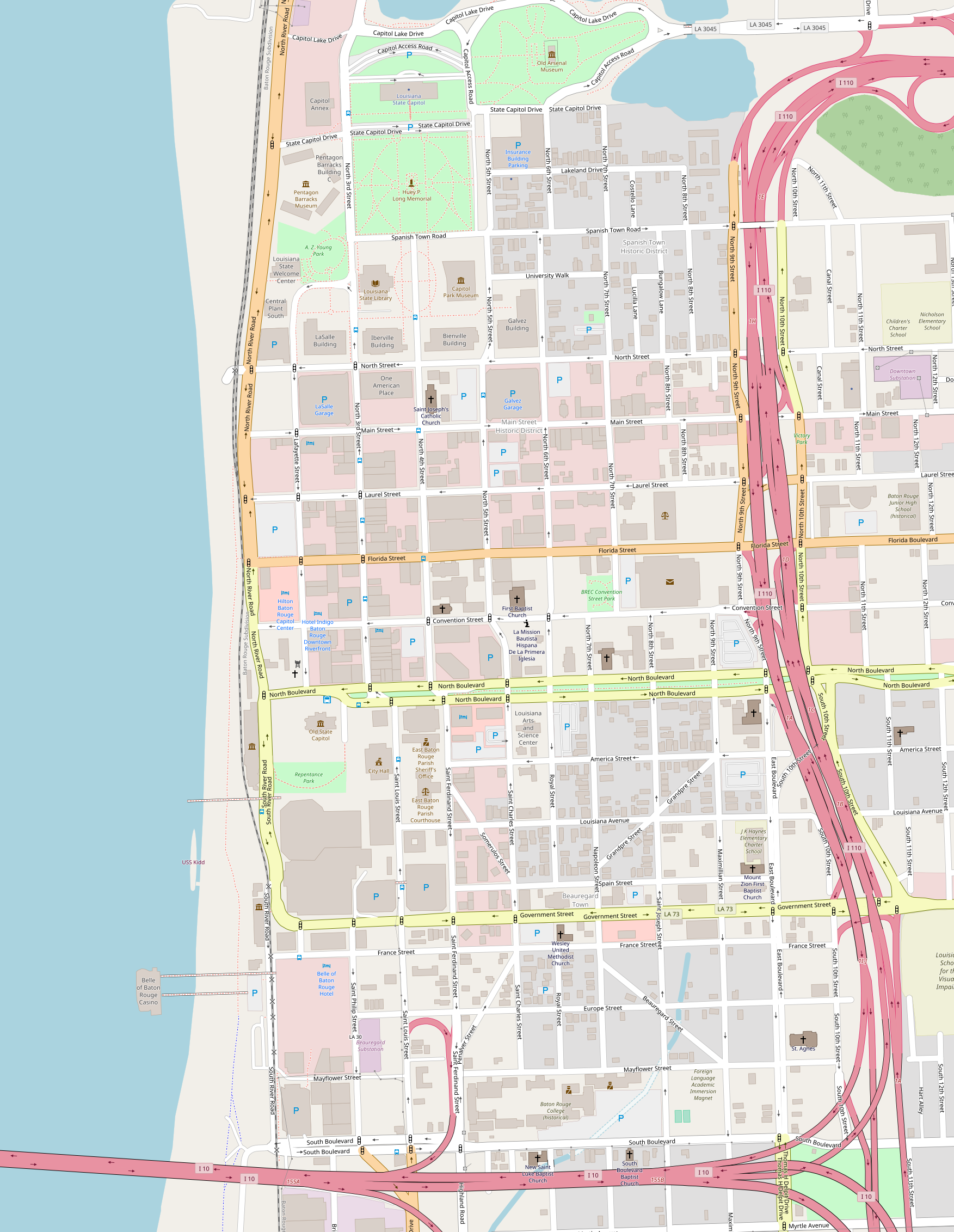
- Location within Baton Rouge Downtown

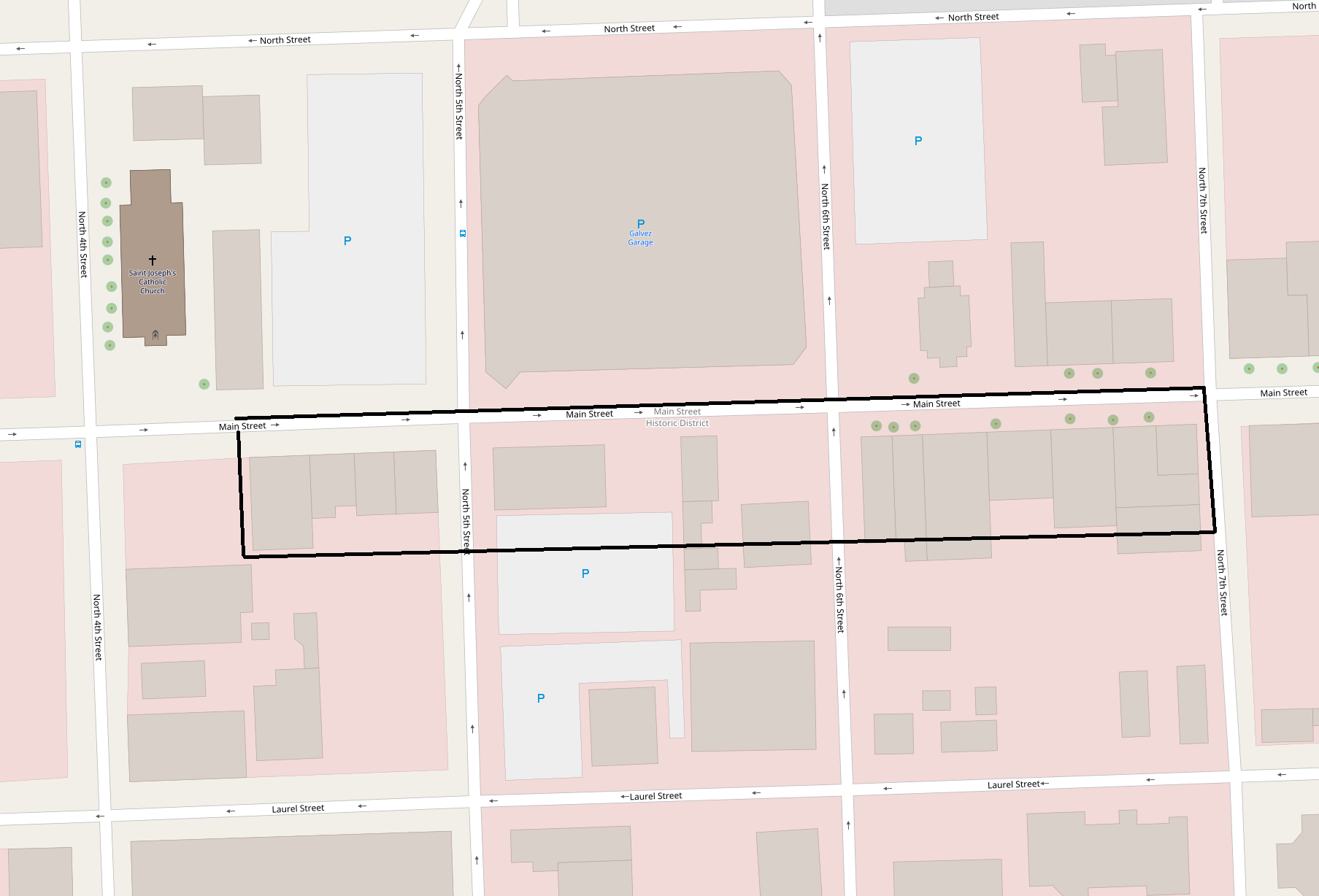
- Location: Main Street between North 4th Street and North 7th Street, Baton Rouge, Louisiana
- Coordinates: 30°27′05″N 91°11′07″W
- Area: 2.5 acres (1.0 ha)
- Architectural style: Classical Revival, Late Victorian, Art Deco
- NRHP reference No.: 85002785
- Added to NRHP: November 7, 1985

Main Street Historic District is a historic district in downtown Baton Rouge, Louisiana, United States, located along Main Street, from North 4th Street to North 7th Street.

The 2.5 acres (1.0 ha) area comprises a total of 11 historic commercial buildings, dating from c.1890 to c.1935.

The historic district was listed on the National Register of Historic Places on November 7, 1985.

== Contributing Properties ==
The historical district contains a total of 11 contributing properties, built between c.1890 and c.1935:

- Saltz Building, 442 Main Street, 30°27′05″N 91°11′11″W, built 1924.
- Building at 450-454 Main Street, 30°27′05″N 91°11′10″W, built c.1920.
- Building at 460 Main Street, 30°27′05″N 91°11′10″W, built c.1935.
- Building at 500 Main Street, 30°27′05″N 91°11′09″W, built c.1890.
- Commercial Building #1, 30°27′05″N 91°11′08″W, built c.1912. No more existing.
- Building at 544-546 Main Street, 30°27′05″N 91°11′07″W, built c.1915.
- Duggan Building, 618 Main Street, 30°27′05″N 91°11′04″W, built c.1920.
- Liberto Building, 624-626 Main Street, 30°27′05″N 91°11′03″W, built 1915.
- Building at 640 Main Street, 30°27′05″N 91°11′02″W, built c.1925.
- Building at 654 Main Street, 30°27′05″N 91°11′02″W, built c.1920.
- Building at 660 Main Street, 30°27′05″N 91°11′01″W, built c.1920.

== See also ==
- National Register of Historic Places listings in East Baton Rouge Parish, Louisiana
