= Mount Hope Plantation House =

Historic house in Louisiana, United States

- Mount Hope
- U.S. National Register of Historic Places
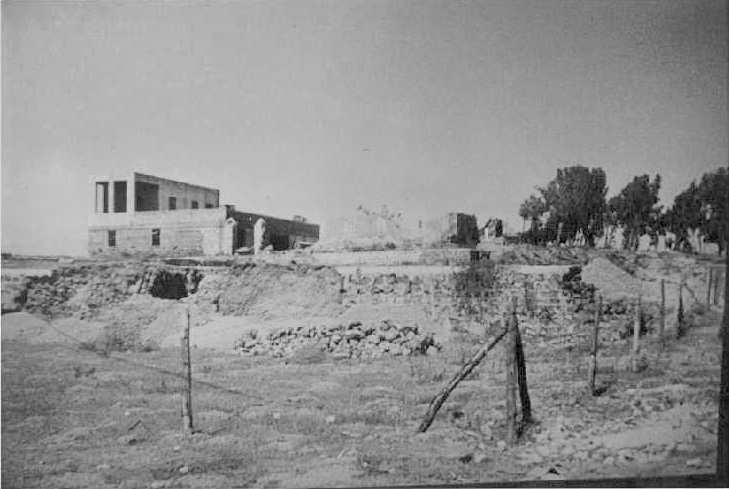

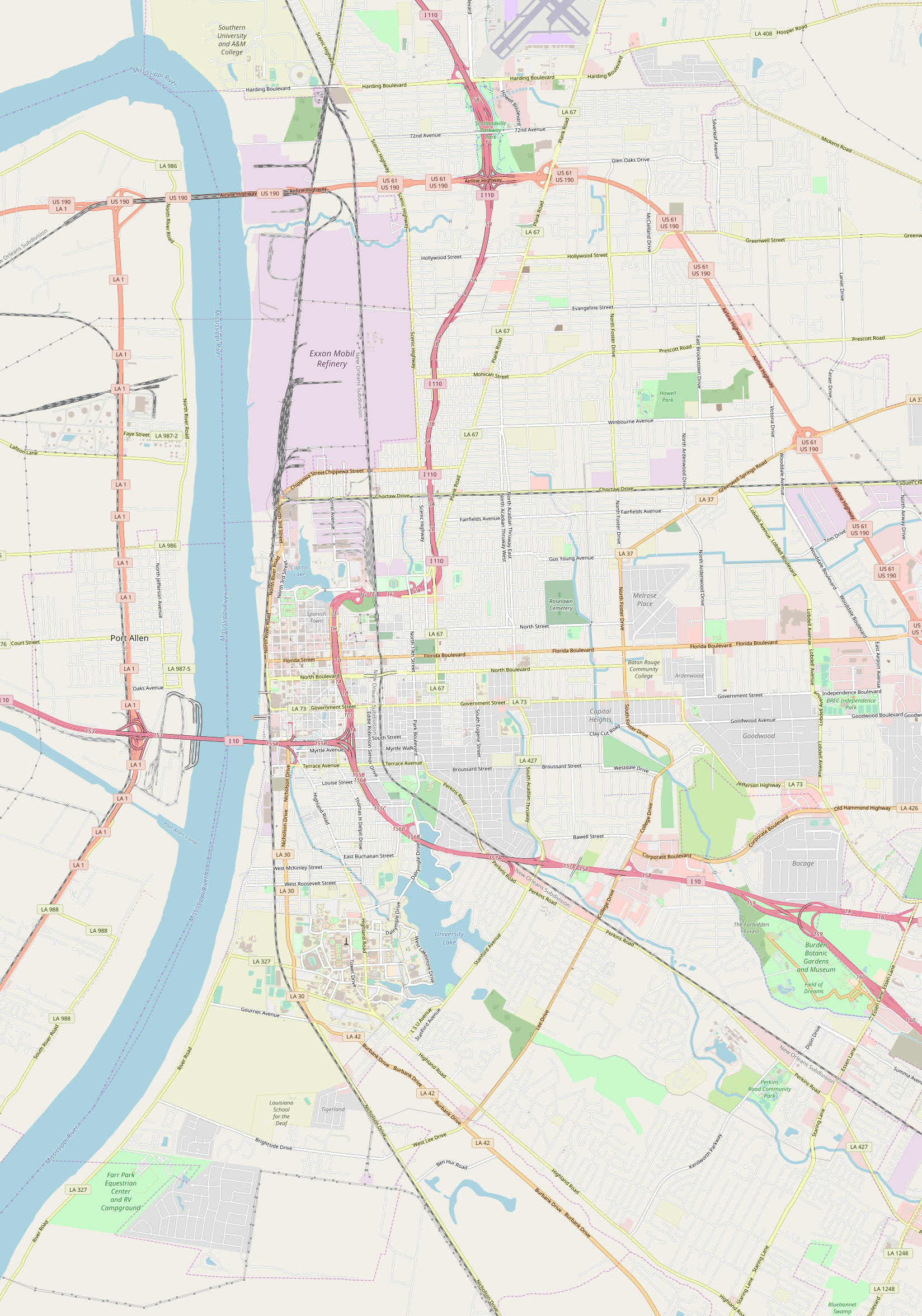
- Location within Baton Rouge
- Location: 8151 Highland Road, Baton Rouge, Louisiana
- Coordinates: 30°22′24″N 91°07′47″W
- Area: 0.3 acres (0.12 ha)
- Built: 1790
- Architectural style: Greek Revival
- NRHP reference No.: 80001717
- Added to NRHP: December 03, 1980

Mount Hope is a historic estate located at 8151 Highland Road in Baton Rouge, Louisiana.

It was built in 1790 and it is the only farmhouse of its kind remaining in the Baton Rouge area.

The house was added to the National Register of Historic Places on December 3, 1980.

== See also ==
- National Register of Historic Places listings in East Baton Rouge Parish, Louisiana
