= Southern University Historic District =

Historic district in Louisiana, United States

- U.S. National Register of Historic Places
- U.S. Historic district
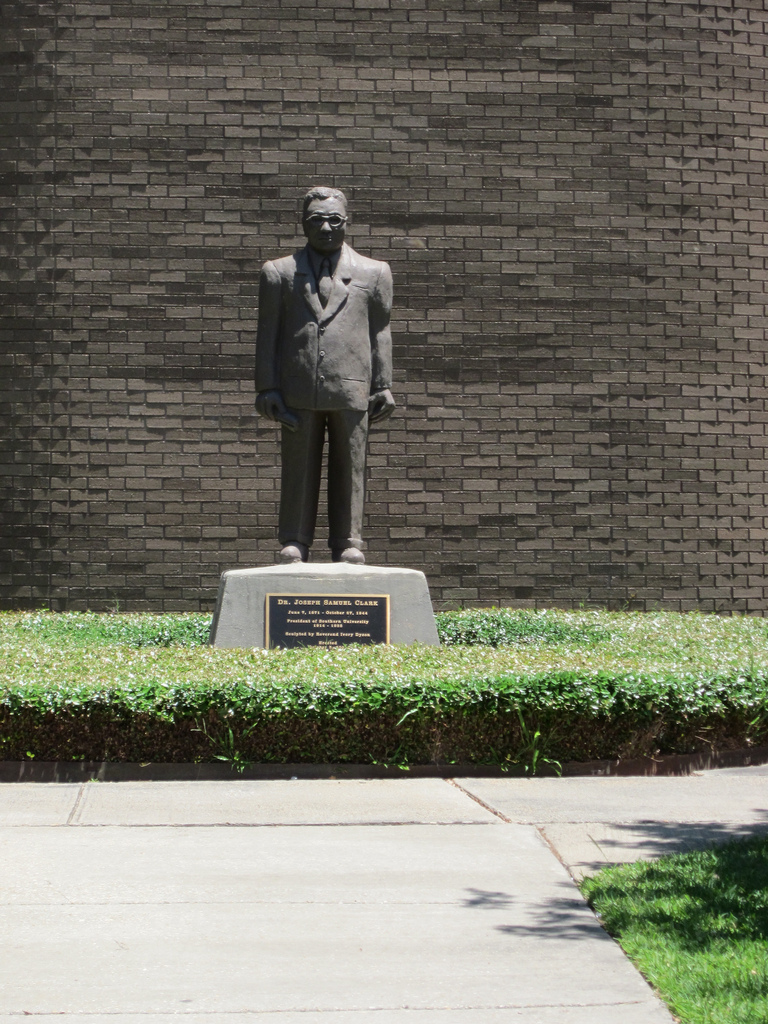
- Dr. Joseph Samuel Clark statue in front of Administration Building on Leon Netterville Drive

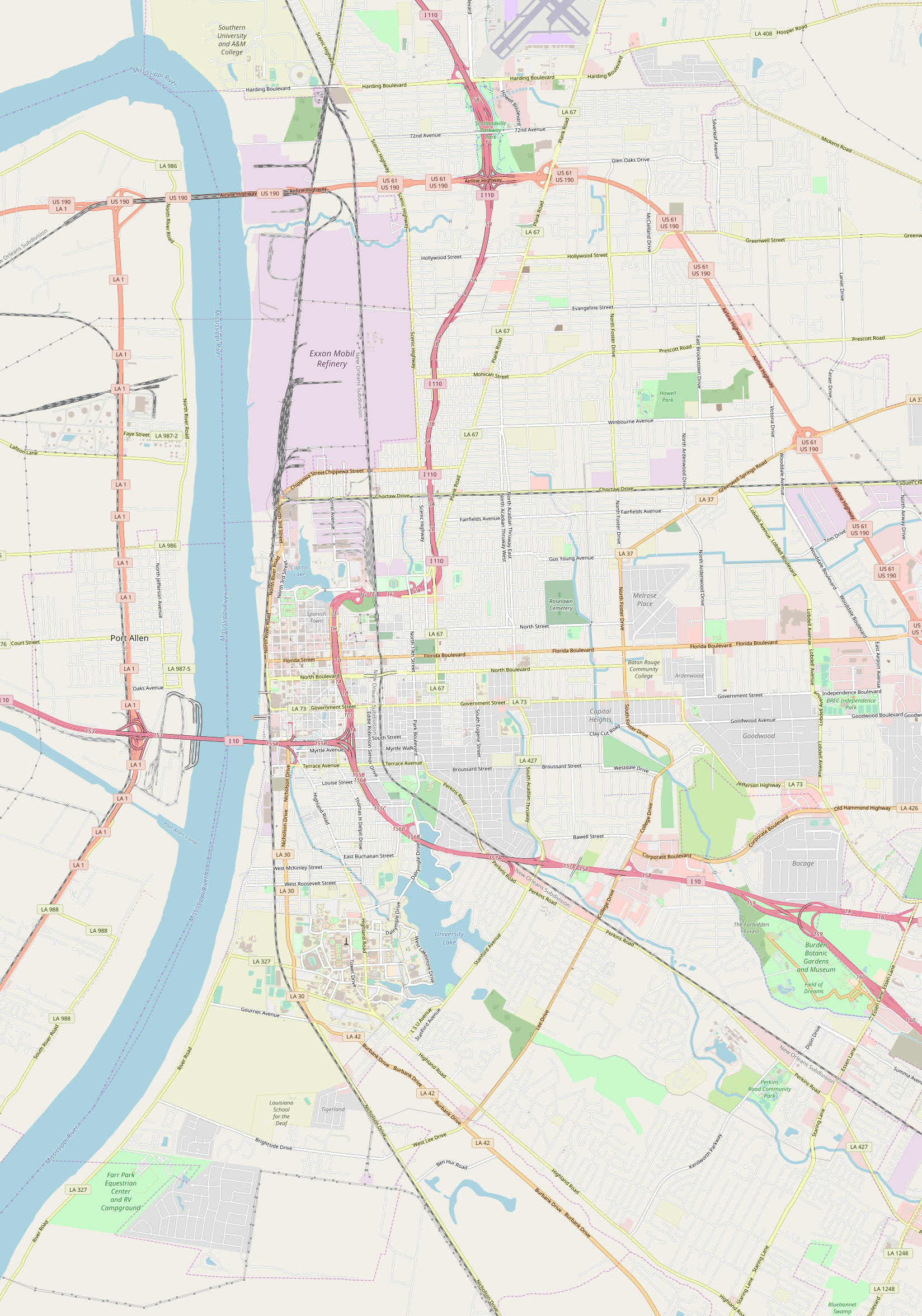
- Location within Baton Rouge

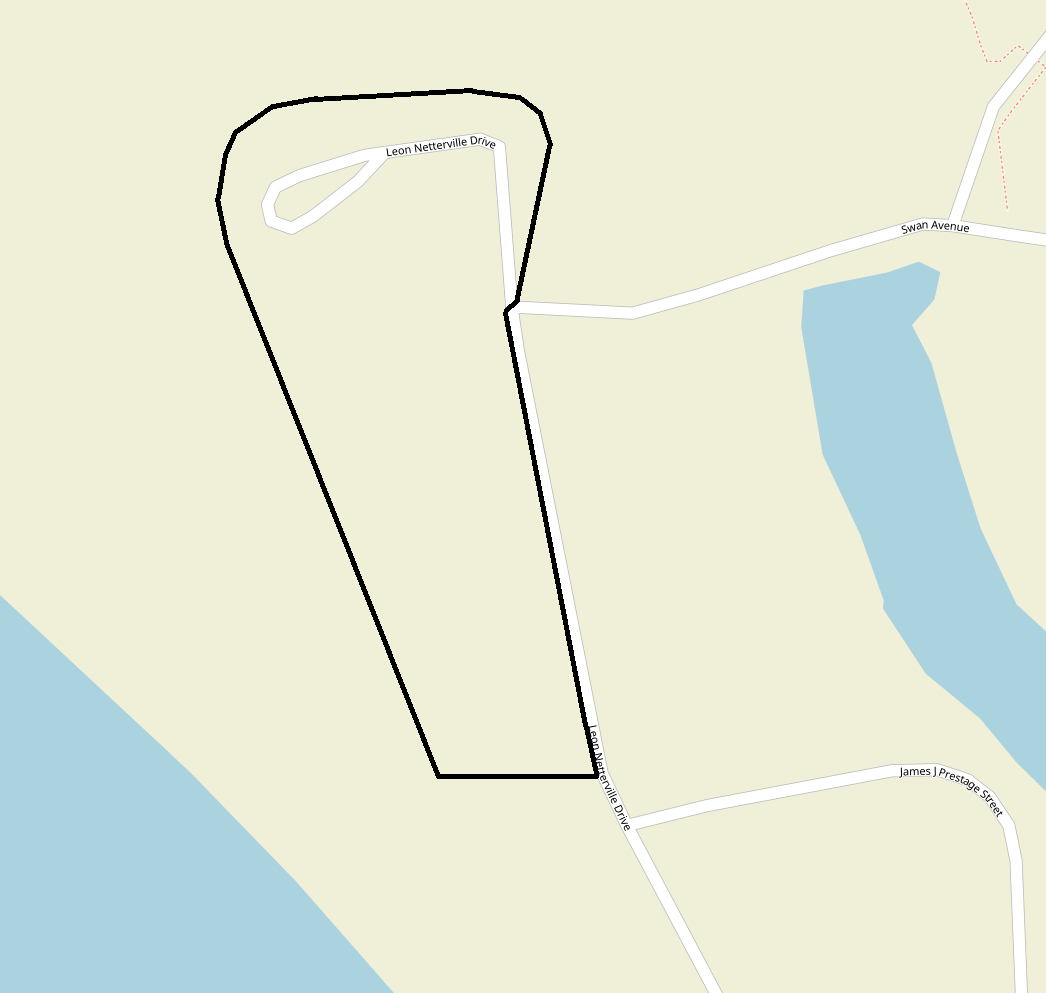
- Location: West of Leon Netterville Drive, on Southern University campus, Baton Rouge, Louisiana
- Coordinates: 30°31′23″N 91°11′52″W
- Area: 7 acres (2.8 ha)
- Architectural style: Greek Revival, Italianate
- NRHP reference No.: 99000590 (original); 100005185 (increase)

Significant dates
- Added to NRHP: May 20, 1999
- Boundary increase: April 16, 2020

Southern University Historic District is a historic district located on Southern University campus in Baton Rouge, Louisiana, United States.

When first listed, the 7-acre (2.8 ha) area comprised a total of 5 historic buildings, dating from c.1870 to 1928.

The historic district was listed on the National Register of Historic Places on May 20, 1999, with a boundary increase on April 16, 2020.

== Contributing properties ==
The historical district contains a total of 5 contributing properties, built between c.1870 and 1928:

- Laundry/Riverside Hall, 30°31′26″N 91°11′55″W, built 1922 as a single story laundry. Some time in 1930s was enlarged and renamed Riverside Hall.
- Industrial Building for Girls, 30°31′26″N 91°11′53″W, built 1920. Also known as the Home Economics Building and McNair Hall.
- Machine Shop, 30°31′27″N 91°11′52″W, built 1921. No more existing.
- Industrial Building for Boys, 30°31′27″N 91°11′51″W, built 1921. Building was enlarged in 1940s. Also known as the Mechanical Arts Building and the Industrial Arts Building.
- Martin L. Harvey Auditorium, 30°31′23″N 91°11′53″W, built 1928. Now hosting the Southern University Museum of Art.
- Southern University Archives Building, 30°31′18″N 91°11′50″W, built c.1870. Also individually listed.

== See also ==
- National Register of Historic Places listings in East Baton Rouge Parish, Louisiana
