= Baker Presbyterian Church =

Historic church in Louisiana, United States

- U.S. National Register of Historic Places
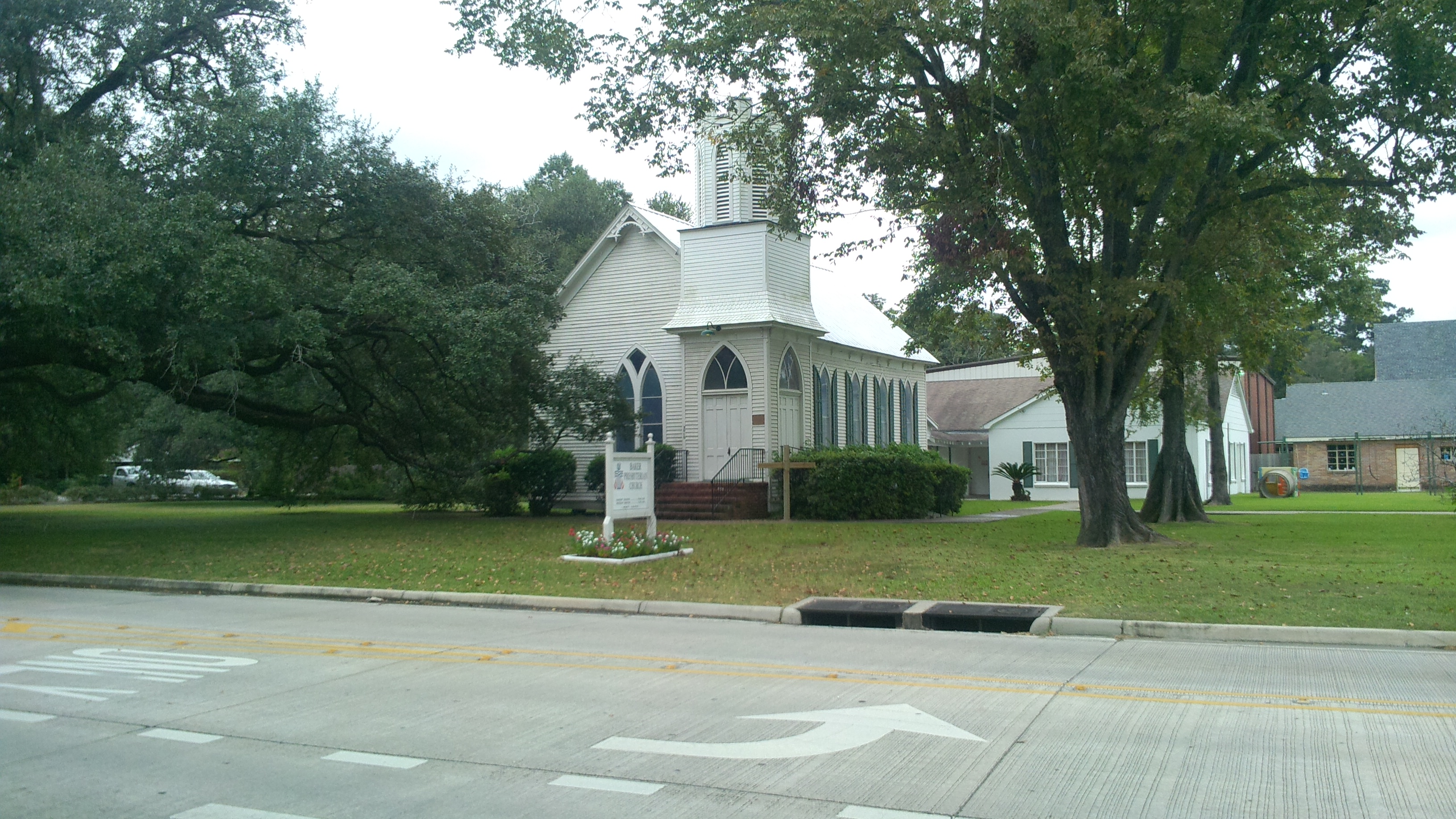

- Location within Louisiana Location within the United States
- Location: 3015 Groom Road, Baker, Louisiana
- Coordinates: 30°35′19″N 91°10′09″W
- Area: less than one acre
- Built: 1905
- Built by: Harris McVea
- Architectural style: Gothic Revival
- NRHP reference No.: 90000346
- Added to NRHP: March 1, 1990

Baker Presbyterian Church is a historic church in Gothic Revival located at 3015 Groom Road in Baker, Louisiana.

Built in 1905, the one-story clapboard church and the two-story crenelated bell tower are almost intact since the time of their construction.

The church was added to the National Register of Historic Places on March 1, 1990.

== See also ==
- National Register of Historic Places listings in East Baton Rouge Parish, Louisiana
