= Longwood (Baton Rouge, Louisiana) =

Historic house in Louisiana, United States

- U.S. National Register of Historic Places
- Location within Louisiana Location within the United States
- Location: 15417 River Road, Baton Rouge, Louisiana
- Coordinates: 30°20′30″N 91°08′27″W
- Area: 18 acres (7.3 ha)
- Built: c.1845
- Architectural style: Greek Revival
- NRHP reference No.: 83000501
- Added to NRHP: July 7, 1983

Label appearing on all bottles of syrup made with Longwood sugar cane.

Longwood (c. 1785) is a plantation located at 15417 River Road in East Baton Rouge Parish, Louisiana, which was listed on National Register of Historic Places in 1983. Directly across the street is a levee holding back the Mississippi River.

== Style ==
The house is two storied and built in the Greek Revival Style with four Doric columns supporting the two front porches. It was built in a non-traditional "T" floor pattern. A rear addition was added in the late 19th century, and the kitchen brought up after that. The indoor corridors, however, are a cruciform pattern. Except for the kitchen, the house was built all together in its entirety.

There are four chimneys that feed into 7 rooms They are on two floors at either end of the house and two in the middle.

== Historic significance ==
Longwood is one of four remaining plantation homes in the Baton Rouge area still in good condition. Many of Baton Rouge's antebellum homes have been lost due to urbanization and to decay but Longwood remains one of four still left in its style. However, it is unique in that it is one of the few plantation homes in the region that did not add an additional "L" wing when modernizing. The result is the cruciform style mentioned previously.

== History ==
Longwood, a former sugar cane plantation, used to occupy all the land from the Mississippi River to Highland Road. The original tract was a land grant from the King of Spain.

== Changes ==
Since construction of the house several changes have been made. An outbuilding was moved to the house and converted into a kitchen. Several wooden paneled doors were replaced with glass ones. Bathroom and closets were added to several rooms with windows for the bathrooms.

The changes can be considered minor since they did not affect the house's architecture.

A shed and barn are located on the property and are thought to have been built in 1928.

The 18-acre (73,000 m^{2}) property, with three contributing buildings, was listed on National Register of Historic Places on July 7, 1983.

== See also ==
- National Register of Historic Places listings in East Baton Rouge Parish, Louisiana
