= National Register of Historic Places listings in East Baton Rouge Parish, Louisiana =

Location of East Baton Rouge Parish in Louisiana

This is a list of the National Register of Historic Places listings in East Baton Rouge Parish, Louisiana.

This is intended to be a complete list of the properties and districts on the National Register of Historic Places in East Baton Rouge Parish, Louisiana, United States. The locations of National Register properties and districts for which the latitude and longitude coordinates are included below, may be seen in a map.

There are 95 properties and districts listed on the National Register in the parish, including 3 National Historic Landmarks. Another three properties were once listed but have been removed.

This National Park Service list is complete through NPS recent listings posted June 19, 2026.

== Current listings ==
| | Name on the Register | Image | Date listed | Location | City or town | Description |
|---|---|---|---|---|---|---|
| 1 | Audubon Plantation House | Audubon Plantation House | May 14, 1987 (#87000729) | 21371 Hoo Shoo Too Road; 30°21′05″N 90°57′20″W | Baton Rouge | |
| 2 | Baker High School Auditorium | Baker High School Auditorium | January 29, 2014 (#13001125) | 3200 Groom Road; 30°35′15″N 91°09′51″W | Baker | |
| 3 | Baker Presbyterian Church | Baker Presbyterian Church | March 1, 1990 (#90000346) | 3015 Groom Road; 30°35′19″N 91°10′09″W | Baker | |
| 4 | Barthel Pigeonnier | Barthel Pigeonnier | July 13, 1983 (#83000499) | 2161 Nicholson Drive; 30°25′34″N 91°11′12″W | Baton Rouge | |
| 5 | Baton Rouge Electric Company (BRECO) Public Utilities Complex | Baton Rouge Electric Company (BRECO) Public Utilities Complex | July 13, 2017 (#100001311) | 1509 Government Street; 30°26′40″N 91°10′22″W | Baton Rouge | Also known as Gulf States Utilities (GSU) and Entergy. The 3.165 acres (1.281 ha) area comprises three contributing properties built between 1915 and 1940. |
| 6 | Baton Rouge High School | Baton Rouge High School | November 6, 1986 (#86003130) | 2825 Government Street; 30°26′43″N 91°09′35″W | Baton Rouge | |
| 7 | Baton Rouge Junior High School | Baton Rouge Junior High School | September 27, 1984 (#84001271) | 1100 Laurel Street; 30°27′02″N 91°10′43″W | Baton Rouge | Also known as City Court Building. Now hosting Baton Rouge Department of Public Works. |
| 8 | Baton Rouge National Cemetery | Baton Rouge National Cemetery | July 9, 1997 (#97000768) | 220 North 19th Street; 30°26′58″N 91°10′03″W | Baton Rouge | |
| 9 | Baton Rouge Savings and Loan Association | Baton Rouge Savings and Loan Association | January 29, 2014 (#13001126) | 400 North Boulevard; 30°26′48″N 91°11′11″W | Baton Rouge | |
| 10 | Baton Rouge Waterworks Company Standpipe | Baton Rouge Waterworks Company Standpipe | December 4, 1973 (#73002242) | 131 Lafayette Street; 30°26′51″N 91°11′22″W | Baton Rouge | |
| 11 | Beauregard Town Historic District | Beauregard Town Historic District | October 14, 1980 (#80001713) | Roughly bounded by North Boulevard, East Boulevard, Government Street, South 10th Street, South Boulevard, South River Road and Saint Louis Street; 30°26′36″N 91°11′04″W | Baton Rouge | |
| 12 | Belisle Building | Belisle Building | October 19, 1993 (#93001104) | 344 and 350 3rd Street; 30°27′00″N 91°11′17″W | Baton Rouge | |
| 13 | Borden Dairy | | March 17, 2020 (#100005100) | 4743 Florida Blvd. 30°27′03″N 91°08′30″W | Baton Rouge | |
| 14 | Broussard House | Broussard House | July 10, 2003 (#03000616) | 4512 Highland Road; 30°24′06″N 91°10′13″W | Baton Rouge | |
| 15 | Campbell Apartment Building | Campbell Apartment Building | June 23, 2011 (#11000398) | 528 East State Street; 30°25′09″N 91°10′21″W | Baton Rouge | |
| 16 | Capital City Press Building | Capital City Press Building | October 16, 1986 (#86002870) | 340 Florida Street; 30°26′57″N 91°11′15″W | Baton Rouge | |
| 17 | Central Fire Station | Central Fire Station | April 5, 1984 (#84001277) | 427 Laurel Street; 30°27′03″N 91°11′11″W | Baton Rouge | Now hosting the Robert A. Bogan Firefighters Museum. |
| 18 | City Park Golf Course | City Park Golf Course | December 20, 2002 (#02001546) | 1442 City Park Avenue; 30°25′54″N 91°10′03″W | Baton Rouge | |
| 19 | Cushman House | Cushman House | February 20, 1991 (#91000072) | 1606 Main Street; 30°35′30″N 91°10′01″W | Baker | Now hosting the Baker Heritage Museum. |
| 20 | Downtown Baton Rouge Historic District | Downtown Baton Rouge Historic District | November 10, 2009 (#09000899) | 3rd Street between Main Street and North Boulevard; 30°26′58″N 91°11′18″W | Baton Rouge | |
| 21 | Drehr Place Historic District | Drehr Place Historic District | November 13, 1997 (#97001422) | Roughly bounded by Government Street, South 22nd Street, Myrtle Avenue, and Saint Rose Avenue; 30°26′29″N 91°09′49″W | Baton Rouge | |
| 22 | Dufrocq School | Dufrocq School | March 28, 2002 (#02000268) | 330 South 19th Street; 30°26′43″N 91°10′07″W | Baton Rouge | Also known as Dufrocq Elementary School and Dufrocq Montessori Magnet Elementary School. |
| 23 | East Baton Rouge Parish Library | | July 11, 2024 (#100010507) | 700 Laurel Street; 30°27′02″N 91°11′00″W | Baton Rouge | |
| 24 | Fairhaven Plantation House | Fairhaven Plantation House | February 11, 1988 (#88000102) | 18630 Samuel Road; 30°37′45″N 91°14′00″W | Zachary | |
| 25 | Florence Coffee House | Florence Coffee House | January 20, 1980 (#80001714) | 130 Main Street; 30°27′05″N 91°11′24″W | Baton Rouge | |
| 26 | The French House | The French House | January 13, 1982 (#82002768) | On Louisiana State University Campus, corner of South Campus Drive and Highland Road; 30°24′52″N 91°10′42″W | Baton Rouge | |
| 27 | Fuqua Hardware Store Building | Fuqua Hardware Store Building | May 12, 1999 (#99000497) | 358 3rd Street; 30°27′01″N 91°11′17″W | Baton Rouge | Also part of Downtown Baton Rouge Historic District since its creation on November 10, 2009. |
| 28 | Hart House | Hart House | August 1, 1980 (#80001715) | Iowa Street; 30°25′35″N 91°11′10″W | Baton Rouge | |
| 29 | Heidelberg Hotel and Hotel King | Heidelberg Hotel and Hotel King | May 20, 1982 (#82002769) | 200-201 Lafayette Street; 30°26′55″N 91°11′22″W | Baton Rouge | |
| 30 | Highland Stockade | | March 2, 2000 (#00000191) | Address restricted | Baton Rouge | |
| 31 | Kean's Apartment Building | | July 11, 2024 (#100010510) | 158 West Chimes Street; 30°25′03″N 91°10′39″W | Baton Rouge | |
| 32 | Kleinert Terrace Historic District | Kleinert Terrace Historic District | March 5, 1998 (#98000180) | Roughly bounded by Myrtle Avenue, Perkins Road, Broussard Avenue, and South Eugene Street; 30°26′14″N 91°09′49″W | Baton Rouge | |
| 33 | Kleinpeter House | | August 13, 1986 (#86001494) | 18666 Perkins Road East; 30°20′40″N 91°01′19″W | Baton Rouge | |
| 34 | Knox Building | Knox Building | August 8, 2006 (#06000684) | 447 3rd Street; 30°27′04″N 91°11′19″W | Baton Rouge | Also part of Downtown Baton Rouge Historic District since its creation on November 10, 2009. |
| 35 | Kress Building | Kress Building | August 10, 2006 (#06000714) | 447 3rd Street; 30°27′04″N 91°11′19″W | Baton Rouge | Also part of Downtown Baton Rouge Historic District since its creation on November 10, 2009. |
| 36 | Kenneth C. and Carolyn B. Landry House | Kenneth C. and Carolyn B. Landry House | April 8, 2021 (#100006376) | 1985 Longwood Dr. 30°25′50″N 91°08′36″W | Baton Rouge | |
| 37 | Laurel Street Fire Station | Laurel Street Fire Station | January 31, 2019 (#100003377) | 1801 Laurel St. 30°27′03″N 91°10′11″W | Baton Rouge | |
| 38 | Lee Site (16 EBR 51) | | December 27, 1984 (#84000792) | Address restricted | Baton Rouge | |
| 39 | Leland College | | November 10, 1982 (#82000433) | Off Groom Road, about 0.83 miles (1.34 km) west of Baker; 30°35′34″N 91°10′53″W | Baker | |
| 40 | Les Chenes Verts | | January 21, 1993 (#92001831) | Junction of Highland Road and Jean Lafitte Avenue; 30°20′51″N 91°03′48″W | Baton Rouge | Also known as Live Oaks |
| 41 | Lincoln Theater | Lincoln Theater | December 7, 2010 (#10000980) | 1305 Myrtle Walk Street; 30°26′19″N 91°10′31″W | Baton Rouge | |
| 42 | Longwood | Longwood | July 7, 1983 (#83000501) | 15417 River Road; 30°20′30″N 91°08′27″W | Baton Rouge | |
| 43 | Louisiana State Capitol Building and Gardens | Louisiana State Capitol Building and Gardens | June 9, 1978 (#78001421) | 900 North 3rd Street; 30°27′25″N 91°11′14″W | Baton Rouge | |
| 44 | Louisiana State University, Baton Rouge | Louisiana State University, Baton Rouge | September 15, 1988 (#88001586) | Highland Road; also roughly bounded by West Chime Street, West Lakeshore Drive, Raphael Semmes Drive, Highland Road, S. Campus Drive, Dorothy Dix Drive, Minnie Fisk Drive, East Parker Boulevard, South Quad Drive, West Stadium Road, and Nicholson Drive; 30°24′48″N 91°10′48″W | Baton Rouge | A boundary increase was approved April 10, 2024. |
| 45 | LSU Campus Mounds | LSU Campus Mounds | March 1, 1999 (#99000236) | Along Field House Drive, on Louisiana State University Campus; 30°24′54″N 91°10′56″W | Baton Rouge | |
| 46 | Magnolia Cemetery | Magnolia Cemetery | January 31, 1985 (#85000161) | 422 North 19th Street; 30°27′04″N 91°10′03″W | Baton Rouge | |
| 47 | Magnolia Mound Plantation House Dependency | Magnolia Mound Plantation House Dependency | August 9, 1977 (#77000669) | 2161 Nicholson Drive; 30°25′30″N 91°11′11″W | Baton Rouge | |
| 48 | Magnolia Mound Plantation House | Magnolia Mound Plantation House | September 7, 1972 (#72000549) | 2161 Nicholson Drive; 30°25′35″N 91°11′14″W | Baton Rouge | |
| 49 | Main Street Historic District | Main Street Historic District | November 7, 1985 (#85002785) | Main Street between North 4th Street and North 7th Street; 30°27′05″N 91°11′07″W | Baton Rouge | |
| 50 | Manship House | Manship House | November 21, 1980 (#80001716) | 2250 Kleinert Avenue; 30°26′15″N 91°09′50″W | Baton Rouge | Also a contributing property to Kleinert Terrace Historic District since its creation on March 5, 1998. |
| 51 | McKinley High School | McKinley High School | November 16, 1981 (#81000292) | 1520 Thomas H. Delpit Drive; 30°26′02″N 91°10′44″W | Baton Rouge | The present McKinley High School is located elsewhere. The historic building now is being used as the McKinley High School Alumni Center. |
| 52 | Mount Hope Plantation House | Mount Hope Plantation House | December 3, 1980 (#80001717) | 8151 Highland Road; 30°22′24″N 91°07′47″W | Baton Rouge | |
| 53 | Nicholson School | Nicholson School | January 24, 1995 (#94001585) | 1143 North Street; 30°27′11″N 91°10′41″W | Baton Rouge | Now hosting Children's Charter Elementary School. |
| 54 | Old Louisiana Governor's Mansion | Old Louisiana Governor's Mansion | July 24, 1975 (#75000847) | 502 North Boulevard; 30°26′48″N 91°11′06″W | Baton Rouge | Also a contributing property to Beauregard Town Historic District since its creation on October 14, 1980. |
| 55 | Old Louisiana State Capitol | Old Louisiana State Capitol | January 12, 1973 (#73000862) | 100 North Boulevard; 30°26′48″N 91°11′21″W | Baton Rouge | Built in 1847–1852 after the state legislature voted to move the seat of government from New Orleans, within 15 years the "castle" had been severely damaged during the Union Army's Civil War occupation of Baton Rouge. The statehouse was rebuilt and refurbished in the 1880s, including the addition of a stained glass dome. The legislature used the building for the next 50 years, until the current capitol tower was completed in 1932. Restored in the 1990s, the old capitol houses the state's Museum of Political History, which now has multimedia exhibits, free admission, and wheelchair-accessibility. |
| 56 | Old Post Office | Old Post Office | June 9, 1980 (#80001718) | 355 North Boulevard; 30°26′51″N 91°11′14″W | Baton Rouge | Now hosting Baton Rouge City Club. Also part of Downtown Baton Rouge Historic District since its creation on November 10, 2009. |
| 57 | Olinde Building | Olinde Building | April 28, 2014 (#13001142) | 1854 North Street; 30°27′10″N 91°10′11″W | Baton Rouge | Also known as Olinde's Furniture & Appliances and Corona Building |
| 58 | Ory House | | January 21, 1993 (#92001818) | Junction of Highland Road and Jean Lafitte Avenue; 30°20′51″N 91°03′46″W | Baton Rouge | |
| 59 | Pecue House | Pecue House | April 14, 1994 (#94000312) | 2260 Myrtle Avenue; 30°26′18″N 91°09′50″W | Baton Rouge | Also a contributing property to Kleinert Terrace Historic District since its creation on March 5, 1998. |
| 60 | Pentagon Barracks | Pentagon Barracks | July 26, 1973 (#73000863) | Corner of State Capitol Drive and River Road; 30°27′20″N 91°11′22″W | Baton Rouge | Four sides of a once-five-sided structure built between 1819 & 1825 by the U. S. Army adjacent to the Mississippi River, on the site of earlier forts. Held for a time by the Confederacy during the Civil War, property of Louisiana State University in the early 20th century. Today barracks are still used by the Lieutenant Governor and state legislators. |
| 61 | Sarah Peralta Archeological Site | | March 2, 1995 (#95000134) | Address restricted | Baton Rouge | |
| 62 | Joseph Petitpierre (Kleinpeter) House | Joseph Petitpierre (Kleinpeter) House | January 23, 1986 (#86000111) | 5544 Highland Road; 30°23′30″N 91°09′27″W | Baton Rouge | |
| 63 | Port Hudson National Cemetery | Port Hudson National Cemetery | May 20, 1999 (#99000591) | 20978 Port Hickey Road; 30°39′39″N 91°16′26″W | Zachary | Established to bury thousands of Union Army soldiers who fell during the longest siege in U.S. history, 1863's Siege of Port Hudson. |
| 64 | Potts House | Potts House | September 14, 1972 (#72000550) | 831 North Street; 30°27′10″N 91°10′53″W | Baton Rouge | Also a contributing property to Spanish Town historic district since its creation on August 31, 1978. |
| 65 | Powder Magazine | Powder Magazine | June 4, 1973 (#73000864) | Arsenal Park, on Capitol Grounds; 30°27′28″N 91°11′05″W | Baton Rouge | Now hosting the Old Arsenal Museum. |
| 66 | Prince Hall Masonic Temple | Prince Hall Masonic Temple | June 2, 1994 (#94000498) | 1335 North Boulevard; 30°26′52″N 91°10′32″W | Baton Rouge | |
| 67 | Rabalais House | Rabalais House | June 24, 2010 (#10000388) | 1300 Steele Boulevard; 30°26′14″N 91°09′03″W | Baton Rouge | |
| 68 | Reiley-Reeves House | Reiley-Reeves House | May 24, 1979 (#79001060) | 810 Park Boulevard; 30°26′27″N 91°10′09″W | Baton Rouge | Also a contributing property to Roseland Terrace Historic District since its creation on March 11, 1982. |
| 69 | Reymond House | Reymond House | June 3, 1998 (#98000663) | 7250 Goodwood Boulevard; 30°26′31″N 91°06′50″W | Baton Rouge | |
| 70 | Eddie Robinson Sr. Historic District | | December 18, 2018 (#100003248) | Roughly bounded by North Blvd., S 18th St., Terrace Ave. & I 110/10; 30°26′23″N 91°10′22″W | Baton Rouge | |
| 71 | Roseland Terrace Historic District | Roseland Terrace Historic District | March 11, 1982 (#82002770) | Bounded by Government Street, South 18th Street, Myrtle Avenue, and South 22nd Street; 30°26′28″N 91°10′04″W | Baton Rouge | |
| 72 | Roumain Building | Roumain Building | April 11, 1985 (#85000727) | 341-343 3rd Street; 30°27′00″N 91°11′19″W | Baton Rouge | Also part of Downtown Baton Rouge Historic District since its creation on November 10, 2009. |
| 73 | St. James Episcopal Church | St. James Episcopal Church | May 5, 1978 (#78001423) | 208 North 4th Street; 30°26′55″N 91°11′12″W | Baton Rouge | |
| 74 | St. Joseph Cathedral | St. Joseph Cathedral | March 22, 1990 (#90000502) | 401 Main Street; 30°27′07″N 91°11′13″W | Baton Rouge | |
| 75 | Jared Young Sanders Jr. House | Jared Young Sanders Jr. House | February 14, 1997 (#97000056) | 2332 Wisteria Street; 30°26′34″N 91°09′47″W | Baton Rouge | Also a contributing property to Drehr Place Historic District since its creation on November 13, 1997. |
| 76 | Santa Maria Plantation House | Santa Maria Plantation House | December 29, 1978 (#78003448) | 19045 Perkins Road East; 30°20′33″N 91°01′02″W | Baton Rouge | |
| 77 | Scott Street School | Scott Street School | July 7, 1994 (#94000681) | 900 North 19th Street; 30°27′24″N 91°10′09″W | Baton Rouge | |
| 78 | John and Amelia Sharp Kleinpeter House | | October 6, 2015 (#15000693) | 7585 Willow Grove Boulevard; 30°22′45″N 91°04′58″W | Baton Rouge | Also known as Willow Grove. Listing comprise a shed, a water well and a cemetery located about 300 yards (270 m) to the northwest. |
| 79 | Southern University Archives Building | Southern University Archives Building | June 11, 1981 (#81000294) | Leon Netterville Drive, Southern University campus 30°31′18″N 91°11′50″W | Scotlandville | Also part of Southern University Historic District since its creation on May 20, 1999. |
| 80 | Southern University Historic District | Southern University Historic District | May 20, 1999 (#99000590) | West of Leon Netterville Drive; also roughly bounded by Harding Blvd., the Mississippi River, Roosevelt Steptoe Dr. and the eastern edge of Lake Kernan, Southern University campus 30°31′23″N 91°11′52″W | Baton Rouge | Second set of addresses represent a boundary increase approved April 16, 2020. |
| 81 | Spanish Town | Spanish Town | August 31, 1978 (#78001422) | Bounded by State Capitol Drive, North 5th Street, North 9th Street and North Street; 30°27′17″N 91°11′01″W | Baton Rouge | |
| 82 | Stewart-Dougherty House | Stewart-Dougherty House | March 28, 1973 (#73000865) | 741 North Street; 30°27′11″N 91°10′58″W | Baton Rouge | Also a contributing property to Spanish Town historic district since its creation on August 31, 1978. |
| 83 | Tessier Buildings | Tessier Buildings | March 16, 1978 (#78001424) | 342, 346, and 348 Lafayette Street; 30°27′00″N 91°11′22″W | Baton Rouge | Also known as Lafayette Buildings |
| 84 | U.S.S. Kidd | U.S.S. Kidd | August 9, 1983 (#83000502) | 305 South River Road; 30°26′40″N 91°11′29″W | Baton Rouge | |
| 85 | US Post Office and Courthouse-Baton Rouge | US Post Office and Courthouse-Baton Rouge | May 18, 2000 (#00000500) | 707 Florida Avenue; 30°26′59″N 91°10′59″W | Baton Rouge | |
| 86 | Union Federal Savings and Loan Association | Union Federal Savings and Loan Association | November 24, 2015 (#15000848) | 500 Laurel Street; 30°27′01″N 91°11′08″W | Baton Rouge | |
| 87 | Virginia Street Historic District | | October 25, 2011 (#11000761) | 4512-4642 Virginia Street and 4338 Florida Street; 30°38′51″N 91°09′22″W | Zachary | Also known as Zachary Historic Village |
| 88 | Warden's House-Old Louisiana State Penitentiary | Warden's House-Old Louisiana State Penitentiary | December 2, 1974 (#74000921) | 701-705 Laurel Street; 30°27′02″N 91°11′00″W | Baton Rouge | |
| 89 | Welsh-Levy Building | Welsh-Levy Building | August 8, 2006 (#06000685) | 447 3rd Street; 30°27′04″N 91°11′19″W | Baton Rouge | Also part of Downtown Baton Rouge Historic District since its creation on November 10, 2009. |
| 90 | Willow Springs | | May 26, 2026 (#100012602) | 20728 Samuels Road; 30°39′27″N 91°15′12″W | Baton Rouge | |
| 91 | Wilson-Jones House | | June 24, 2026 (#100013167) | 16735 Liberty Rd; 30°36′06″N 90°59′45″W | Greenwell Springs vicinity | |
| 92 | Fonville Winans Studio | Fonville Winans Studio | August 27, 1999 (#99001052) | 409 North 7th Street; 30°27′03″N 91°11′01″W | Baton Rouge | The studio of photographer Fonville Winans |
| 93 | Wooddale Tower | | June 17, 2025 (#100011958) | 1885 Wooddale Boulevard; 30°27′54″N 91°06′53″W | Baton Rouge | |
| 94 | Yazoo and Mississippi Valley Railroad Company Depot | Yazoo and Mississippi Valley Railroad Company Depot | May 19, 1994 (#94000463) | 100 South River Road; 30°26′47″N 91°11′25″W | Baton Rouge | |
| 95 | Zachary Railroad Depot | Zachary Railroad Depot | December 28, 1983 (#83003615) | 4434 West Central Avenue; 30°38′53″N 91°09′25″W | Zachary | |

== Former listing ==
| | Name on the Register | Image | Date listed | Date removed | Location | City or town | Description |
|---|---|---|---|---|---|---|---|
| 1 | Adams House | | May 8, 1998 (#98000440) | June 11, 2015 | 421 North 7th Street; 30°27′03″N 91°11′01″W | Baton Rouge | Delisted in 2015 for loss of integrity of location and setting due to move, and for several alterations to original structure. |
| 2 | Gracelane Plantation House | | August 29, 1997 (#97000967) | January 31, 2019 | 14444 Perkins Road; 30°21′44″N 91°03′29″W | Baton Rouge | Building does not exist anymore, and area is now occupied by Ruelle DeGrace Drive residential buildings. One source also report the plantation house as having been moved and delisted in 2005. |
| 3 | Planter's Cabin | Planter's Cabin | August 23, 1984 (#84001279) | November 29, 2016 | 7815 Highland Road; 30°22′31″N 91°08′01″W | Baton Rouge | |

== See also ==
- List of National Historic Landmarks in Louisiana
- National Register of Historic Places listings in Louisiana
