= Audubon Plantation =

Historic plantation house in Louisiana, United States

- Audubon Plantation House
- U.S. National Register of Historic Places
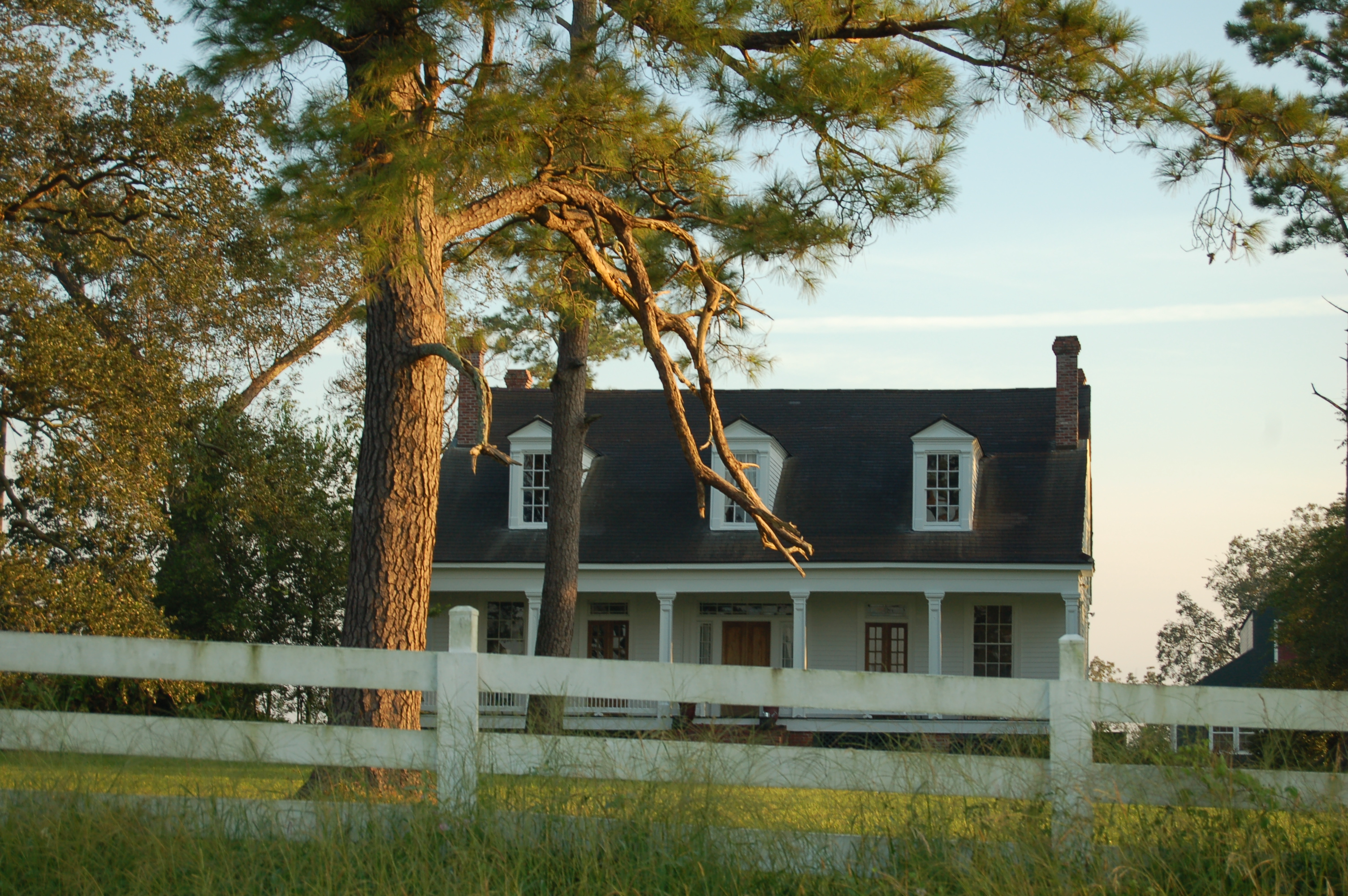

- Location within Louisiana Location within the United States
- Location: 21371 Hoo Shoo Too Road, Baton Rouge, Louisiana
- Coordinates: 30°21′05″N 90°57′20″W
- Area: 2.25 acres (0.91 ha)
- Built: c. 1850
- Architectural style: Greek Revival
- NRHP reference No.: 87000729
- Added to NRHP: May 14, 1987

Audubon Plantation House, also known as Audubon Plantation, is a historic Greek Revival house at 21371 Hoo Shoo Too Road, near Baton Rouge, Louisiana. Built about 1850, the house was listed on the National Register of Historic Places on May 14, 1987, for its local architectural significance.

== Architecture ==
Audubon Plantation House is a one-and-a-half-story frame residence in the Greek Revival style. The house has a central hall plan, two rooms deep, with front and rear galleries. The front and rear parlors are connected by pocket doors, and each room opens to the galleries through French doors.

The house includes Greek Revival detailing on both the exterior and interior. The front and rear galleries have fully articulated entablatures. The front gallery posts include astragals and bolection-molded panels, while the front gallery also has a bolection-molded paneled dado and clapboard sheathing. The National Register nomination described the clapboard treatment under the gallery as unusual for the period but apparently original. The pitched roof includes three front pedimented dormers.

Interior features noted in the National Register nomination include a staircase with a massive turned newel post, molded baseboards and one surviving aedicule-style mantel. The nomination stated that three other mantels had once been present.

The house has features associated with Greek Revival architecture in Louisiana. The Louisiana Division of Historic Preservation describes the style in Louisiana as including elements such as heavy entablatures, square-head openings and square pillars, with examples found in plantation houses and town residences.

== History ==
The early history of Audubon Plantation is unclear. The National Register nomination stated that attempts to establish a chain of title before the late 19th century had not been successful. The plantation was identified as Audubon in the Statement of the Sugar Crop Made in Louisiana for 1892, when it was owned by Octavius Bullion and the house was rented to a Dixon family. An 1890s photograph showed the house in poor condition. For much of the 20th century, the house remained a rural rental house.

Archival material at LSU Libraries indicates that correspondence in the W. Frank and William H. H. Witherell Papers includes references to the acquisition of Audubon Plantation and renovations to the house in 1868. The finding aid also describes 1876 correspondence concerning efforts to raise funds for the plantation, a disputed sale and legal claims.

== Significance ==
Audubon Plantation House was listed on the National Register under Criterion C in the area of architecture. The nomination described it as a rare and important example of a Greek Revival plantation house in the Ascension Parish and East Baton Rouge Parish area. The nomination used both parishes as the architectural context because Audubon was originally in Ascension Parish before the land was later annexed into East Baton Rouge Parish.

The nomination stated that Ascension and East Baton Rouge parishes had been centers of sugar production before the Civil War and that many Greek Revival plantation houses were built during that period. By 1987, however, the State Historic Preservation Office could identify only about 10 surviving Greek Revival plantation houses in the two-parish area. The nomination also noted that Audubon was a Greek Revival cottage, making it more representative of a typical plantation house of the period than the larger two-story plantation houses that made up many of the surviving examples.

== Alterations and integrity ==
The house had been altered before its National Register listing. Around the turn of the 20th century, much of the rear gallery was enclosed for a bathroom and service spaces. Later changes included the enclosure of space under the staircase for a closet, the apparent addition of two small windows in the side gables, replacement doors and rebuilt chimneys. The National Register nomination concluded that the house retained much of its original interior detailing, most of its significant exterior detailing and an intact facade and massing.

== National Register boundary ==
The National Register listing included about 2.25 acres (0.91 ha). The boundary was drawn to include the house and its setting while excluding nonhistoric outbuildings behind the house.

== See also ==
- National Register of Historic Places listings in East Baton Rouge Parish, Louisiana
