= Prince Hall Masonic Temple (Baton Rouge, Louisiana) =

- U.S. National Register of Historic Places
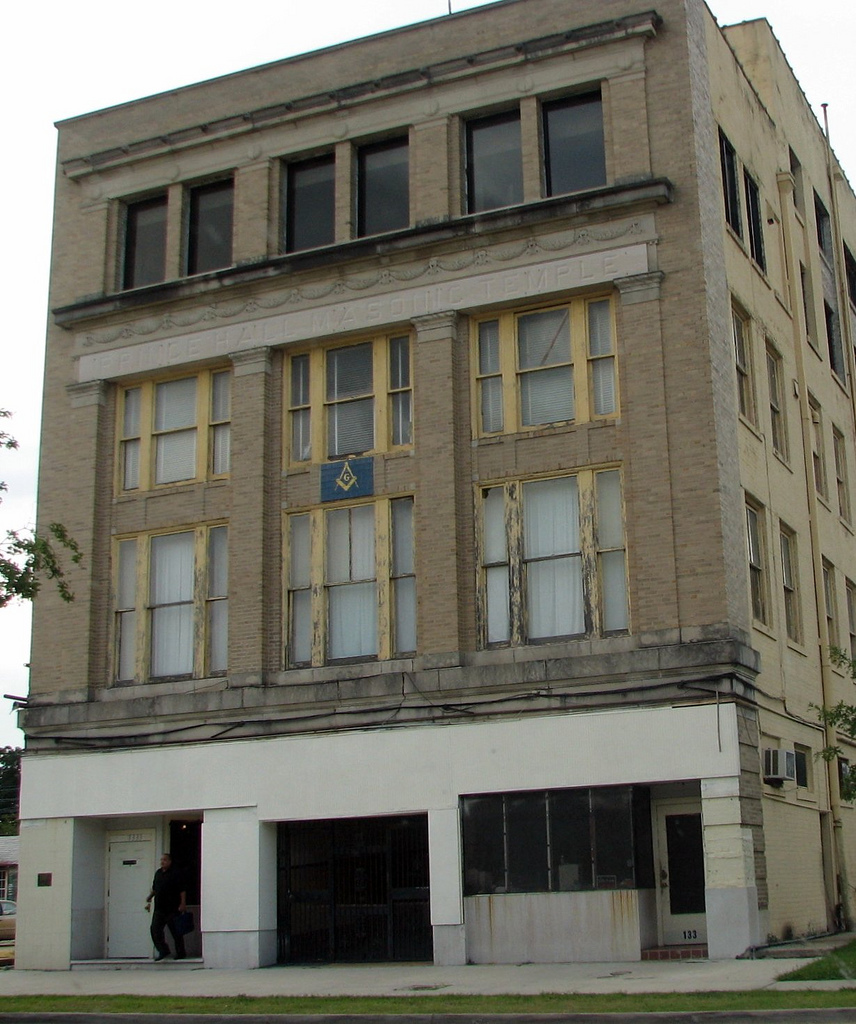

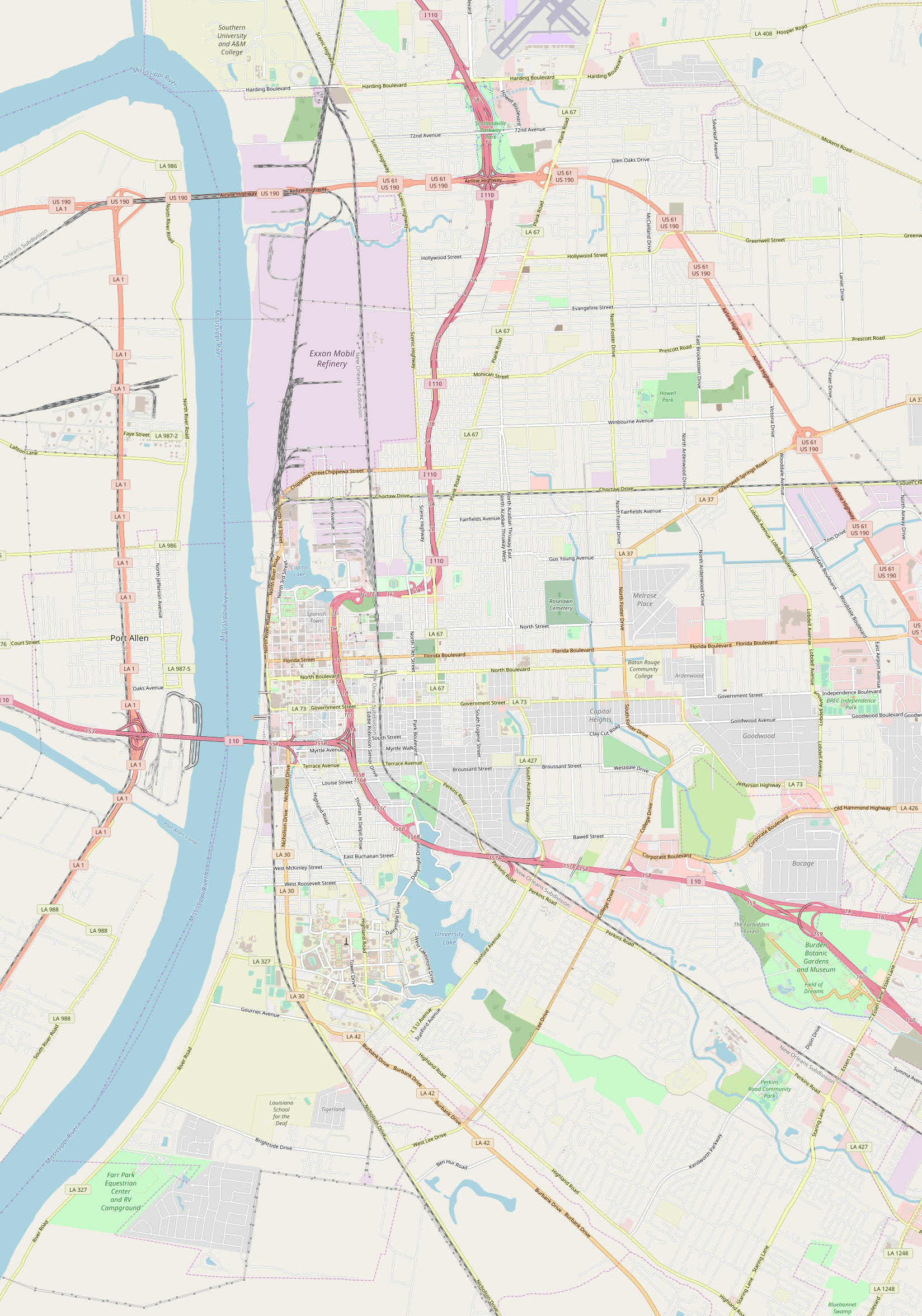
- Location within Baton Rouge
- Location: 1335 North Boulevard, Baton Rouge, Louisiana
- Coordinates: 30°26′52″N 91°10′32″W
- Area: less than one acre
- Built: 1924
- Built by: Conner, Bryant and Bell
- Architect: Wogan and Bernard
- Architectural style: Classical Revival
- NRHP reference No.: 94000498
- Added to NRHP: June 02, 1994

The Prince Hall Masonic Temple is a historic building located at 1335 North Boulevard in Baton Rouge, Louisiana.

Originally designed in 1924 as a meeting hall for the Grand United Order of Odd Fellows, the building housed the Temple Theatre and the Temple Roof Garden, which represented two major point of entertainment for African-American citizens of Baton Rouge. The Temple Theatre is the last remaining of the three city theatres for the large black population, the other two (the Grand Theatre and the McKinley Theatre) are no more in existence. The Temple Roof Garden was particularly popular amongst youth clubs for the dances held until the late 1930s and 1940s.

The building was purchased by the Prince Hall Freemasons in 1948. It was listed on the National Register of Historic Places in 1994.

It was added to the National Register of Historic Places on June 2, 1994.

== See also ==
- National Register of Historic Places listings in East Baton Rouge Parish, Louisiana
