= Baton Rouge City Club =

- Old Post Office
- U.S. National Register of Historic Places
- U.S. Historic district – Contributing property
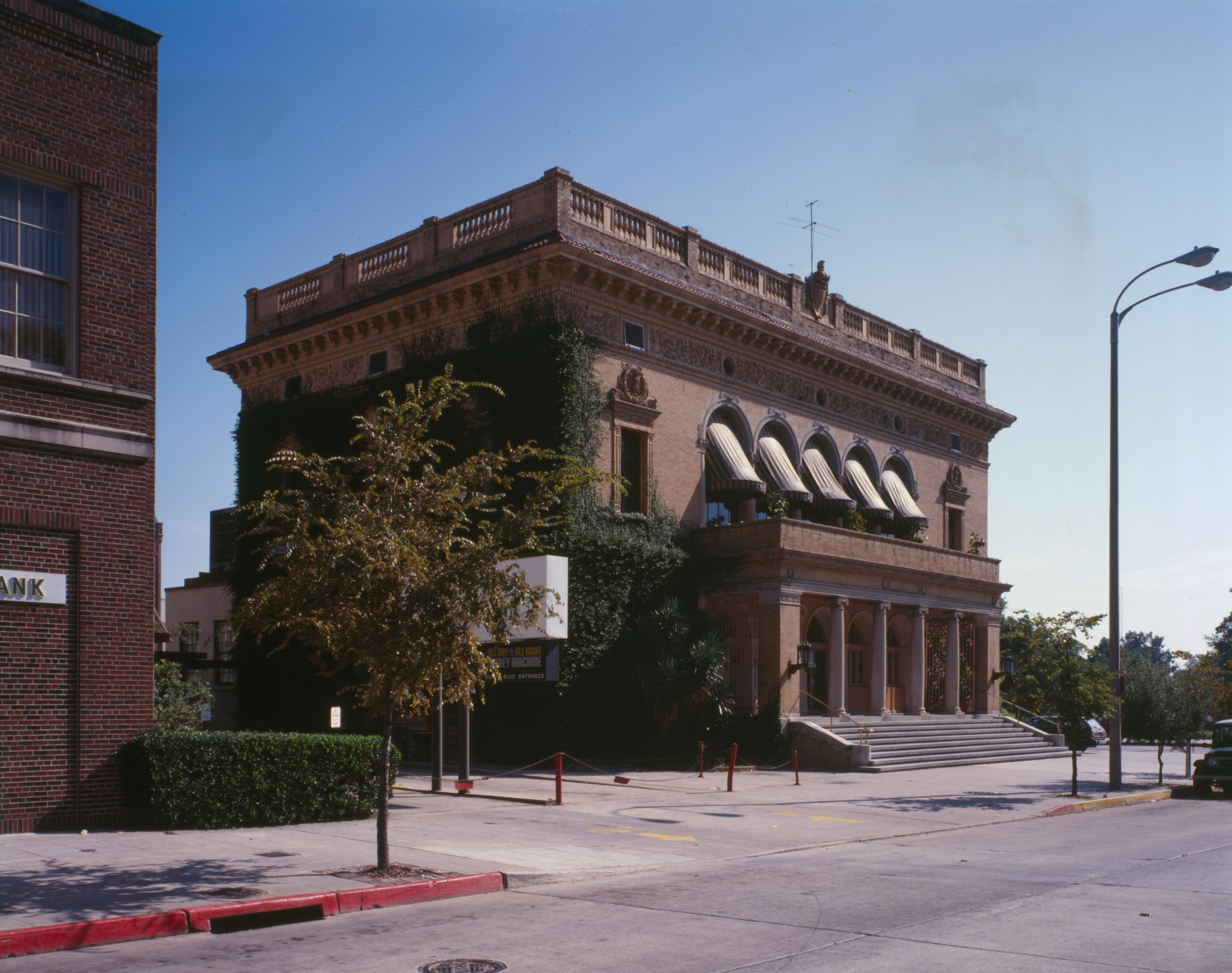

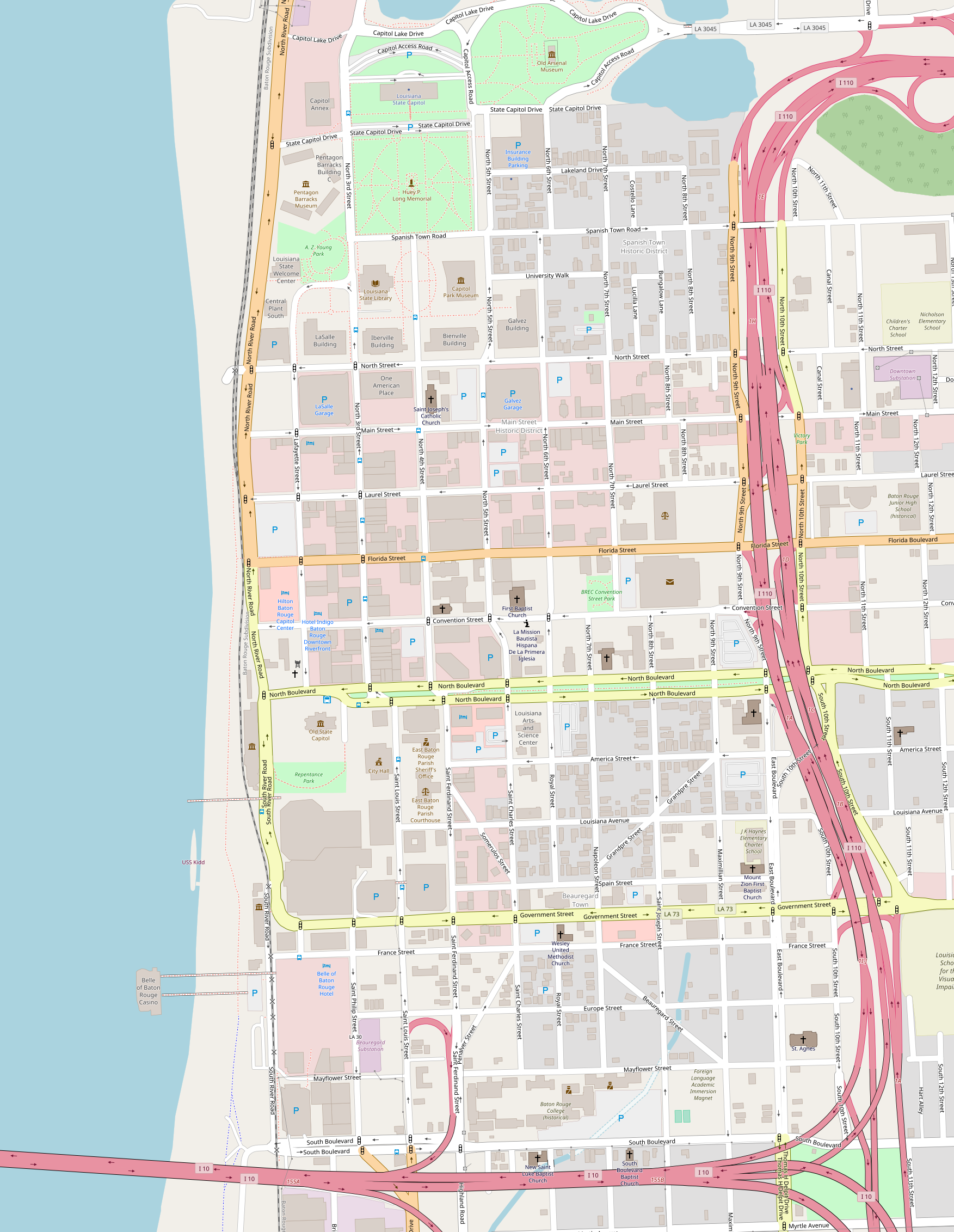
- Location within Baton Rouge Downtown
- Location: 355 North Boulevard, Baton Rouge, Louisiana
- Coordinates: 30°26′51″N 91°11′14″W
- Area: 0.16 acres (0.065 ha)
- Built: 1895
- Architectural style: Renaissance Revival
- Part of: Downtown Baton Rouge Historic District (ID09000899)
- NRHP reference No.: 80001718

Significant dates
- Added to NRHP: June 9, 1980
- Designated CP: November 10, 2009

The Baton Rouge City Club, also known as the Old Post Office, is a historic three-story building at 355 North Blvd in Baton Rouge, Louisiana. It was built in 1895 as a U.S. post office building.

Its NRHP nomination asserts:

The Old Post Office is one of the finest and most pretentious examples of turn-of-the-[20th]-century Renaissance Revival architecture in the state. Few other comparable buildings in Louisiana can boast such a high degree of stylistic sophistication and close adherence to Italian prototypes and such extensive use of terra cotta ornamentation, In its day, its design stood at the forefront of architectural development in the state.

The building was listed on the National Register of Historic Places on June 9, 1980. It was also included in the Downtown Baton Rouge Historic District at the time of its creation on November 10, 2009.

== See also ==
- National Register of Historic Places listings in East Baton Rouge Parish, Louisiana
