= Downtown Baton Rouge Historic District =

Historic district in Louisiana, United States

- U.S. National Register of Historic Places
- U.S. Historic district
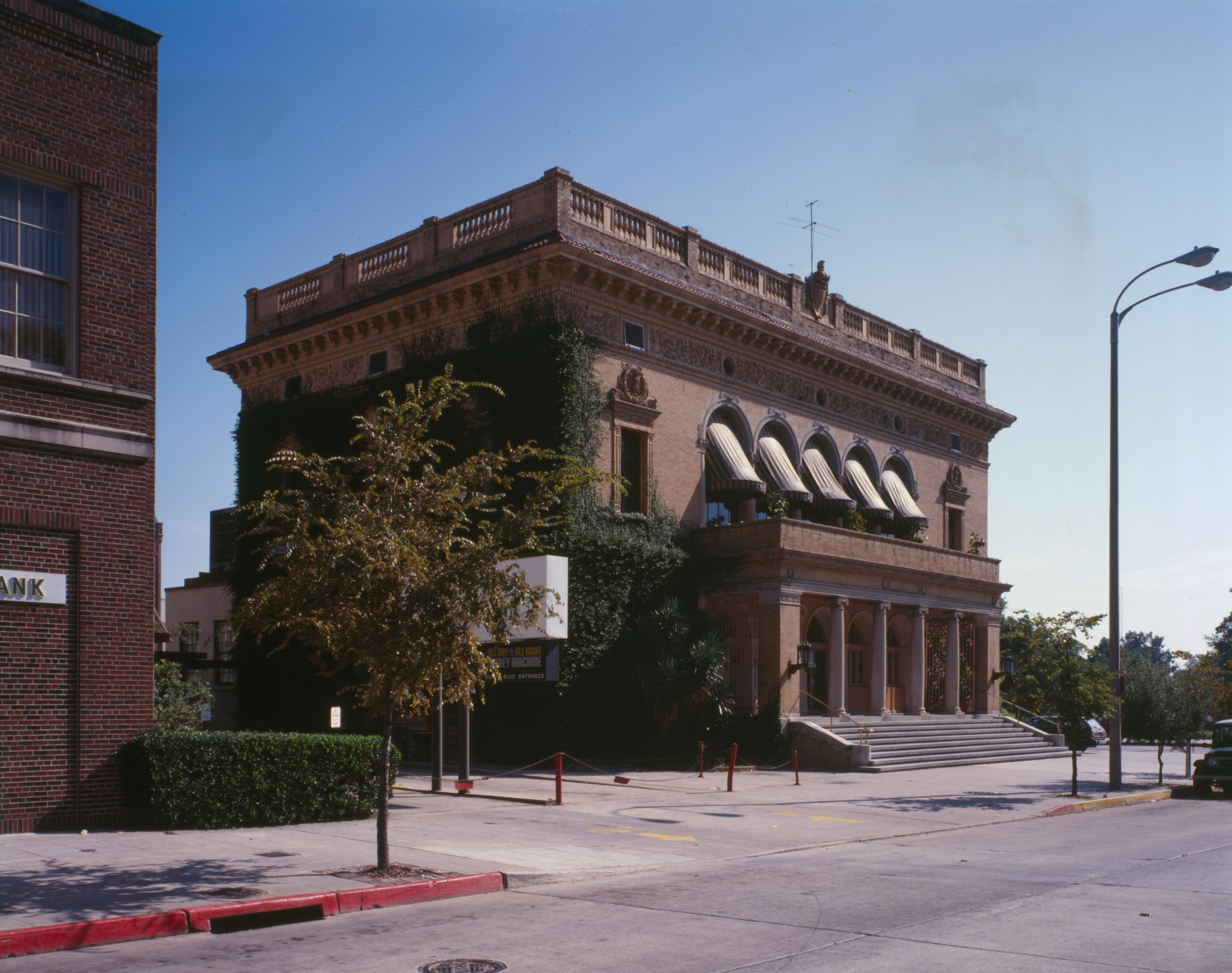
- Old Post Office at 355 North Boulevard

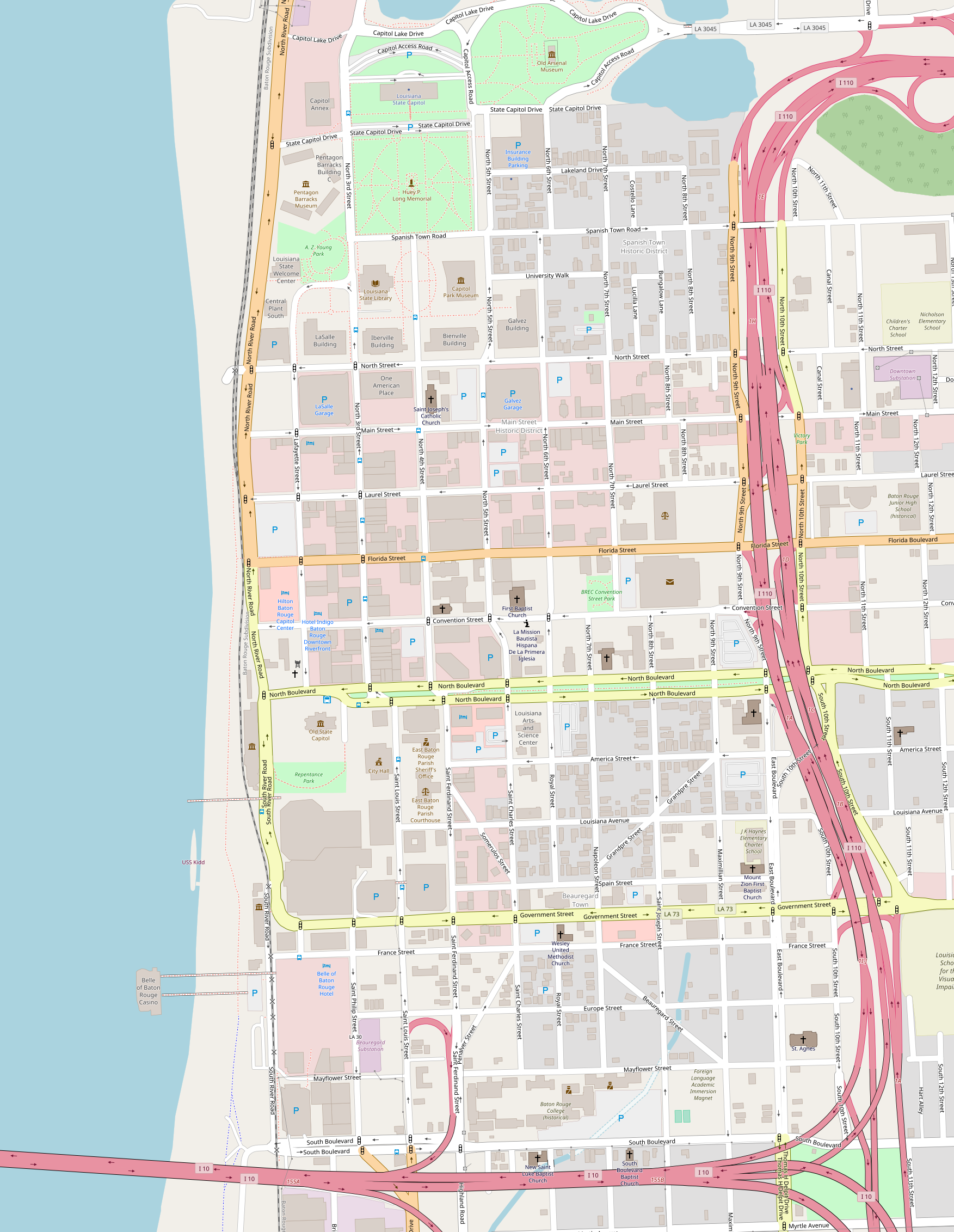
- Location within Baton Rouge Downtown

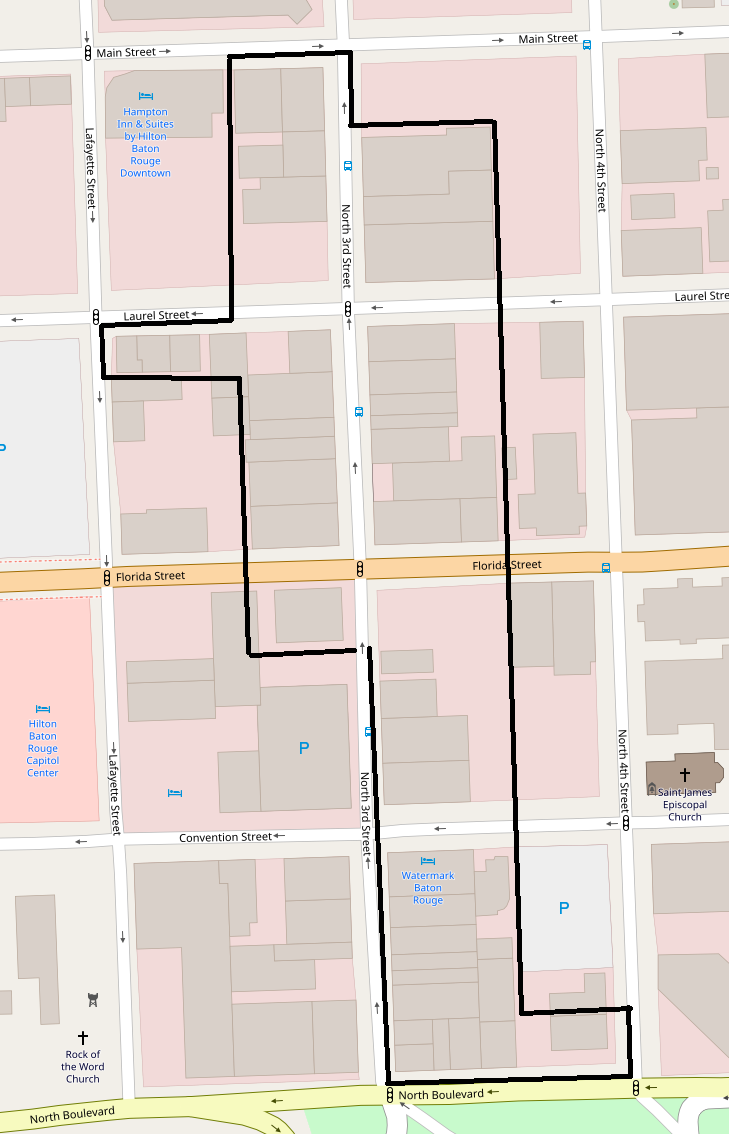
- Location: 3rd Street between Main Street and North Boulevard, Baton Rouge, Louisiana
- Coordinates: 30°26′58″N 91°11′18″W
- Architectural style: Italianate, Classical Revival, Art Deco, International Style
- NRHP reference No.: 09000899
- Added to NRHP: November 10, 2009

Downtown Baton Rouge Historic District is a historic district in downtown Baton Rouge, Louisiana, United States, located along 3rd Street, from Main Street to North Boulevard.

The district comprises a total of 43 commercial buildings ranging in dates from c.1860 to mid-1950s. Third street was downtown Baton Rouge main commercial avenue during historic period. Of the 32 contributing properties, six are also individually listed on the National Register of Historic Places.

Despite being located inside the district area, the individually listed Belisle Building is not part of Downtown Baton Rouge Historic District, as its non-historic elements are evaluated as predominant. The building is therefore considered a non-contributing property.

The historic district was listed on the National Register of Historic Places on November 10, 2009.

== Contributing Properties ==
The historical district contains a total of 32 contributing properties, built between c.1860 and 1957:

- Reymond Building, 263-265 3rd Street, 30°26′57″N 91°11′19″W, built c.1920.
- Triad Building, 301-307-311 3rd Street, 30°26′58″N 91°11′19″W, built 1924.
- W. T. Grant Building, 313-315-319 3rd Street, 30°26′59″N 91°11′19″W, built c.1925.
- Building at 331-333 3rd Street, 30°26′59″N 91°11′19″W, built c.1920.
- Building at 335 3rd Street, 30°27′00″N 91°11′19″W, built 1940s.
- Roumain Building, 341-343 3rd Street, 30°27′00″N 91°11′19″W, built 1913. Also individually listed.
- Building at 359 3rd Street, 30°27′01″N 91°11′19″W, built c.1920. Now hosting Baton Rouge Area Convention and Visitors Bureau.
- Brunswick Building, 240 Laurel Street, 30°27′01″N 91°11′20″W, built c.1905.
- Building at 222 Laurel Street, 30°27′01″N 91°11′21″W, built c.1905.
- Building at 210 Laurel Street, 30°27′01″N 91°11′21″W, built c.1955. Demolished between 2015 and 2016.
- Building at 421-423 3rd Street, 30°27′03″N 91°11′19″W, built c.1915.
- Kress Building, 447 3rd Street, 30°27′04″N 91°11′19″W, built c.1935. Also individually listed.
- Knox Building, 447 3rd Street, 30°27′04″N 91°11′19″W, built 1887. Also individually listed.
- Welsh-Levy Building, 447 3rd Street, 30°27′04″N 91°11′19″W, built 1887. Also individually listed.
- Fidelity Bank, 440 3rd Street, 30°27′03″N 91°11′17″W, built 1957.
- The Commerce Building, 400 3rd Street and 333 Laurel Street, 30°27′02″N 91°11′17″W, built 1954-55.
- Fuqua Hardware Store Building, 358 3rd Street, 30°27′01″N 91°11′17″W, built 1905. Also individually listed.
- Louisiana Theater, 336 3rd Street, 30°27′00″N 91°11′17″W, built 1913.
- Latil's Stationery, 324-326 3rd Street, 30°26′59″N 91°11′17″W, built c.1915.
- Building at 302 3rd Street, 30°26′58″N 91°11′17″W, built 1940s.
- Louisiana National Bank, 236 3rd Street, 30°26′56″N 91°11′17″W, built between 1908 and 1910.
- Mayer Hotel, 214 3rd Street, 30°26′55″N 91°11′17″W, built between 1908 and 1911.
- Masonic Lodge (St. James Lodge #47, F&AM), 200 3rd Street, 30°26′54″N 91°11′17″W.
- Louisiana National Bank, 150 3rd Street, 30°26′53″N 91°11′17″W, built c.1925.
- Building at 136 3rd Street, 30°26′52″N 91°11′17″W, built c.1920.
- Union Bank and Trust Company, 124 3rd Street, 30°26′51″N 91°11′17″W, built c.1925.
- Building at 301-303-307 North Boulevard, 30°26′50″N 91°11′17″W, built c.1860 to c.1870.
- Building at 311 North Boulevard, 30°26′50″N 91°11′16″W, built c.1915.
- Building at 315 North Boulevard, 30°26′50″N 91°11′16″W, built c.1915.
- Building at 321 North Boulevard, 30°26′50″N 91°11′16″W, built c.1915.
- Fraternal Order of Eagles Building, 327 North Boulevard, 30°26′50″N 91°11′15″W, built c.1925.
- Old Post Office, 355 North Boulevard, 30°26′51″N 91°11′14″W, built 1894. Also individually listed. Now hosting Baton Rouge City Club.
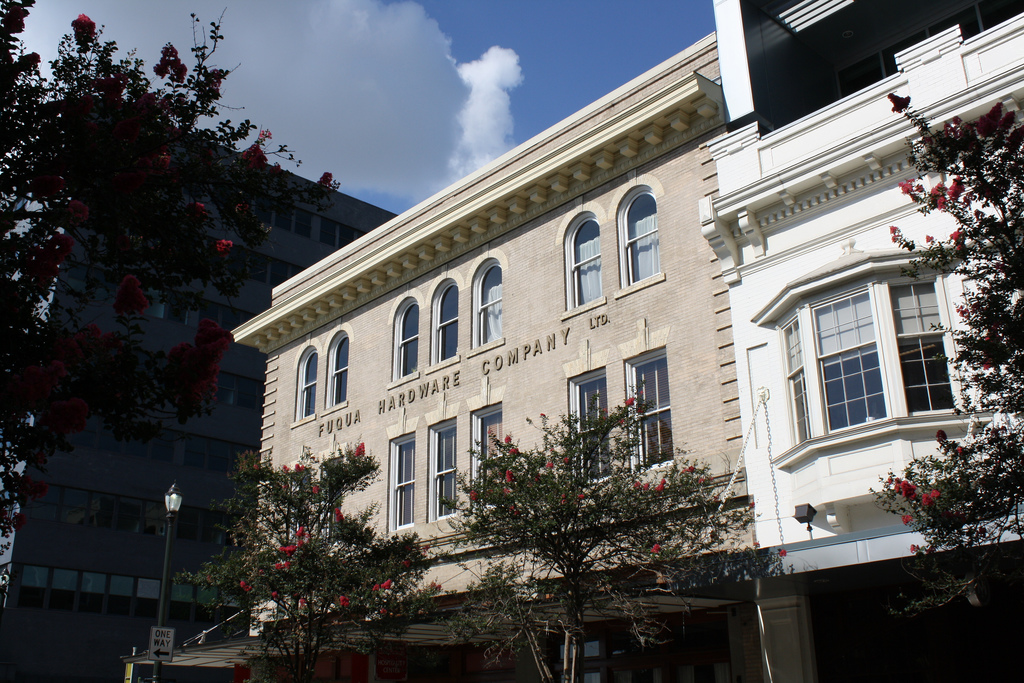
Fuqua Hardware Store Building

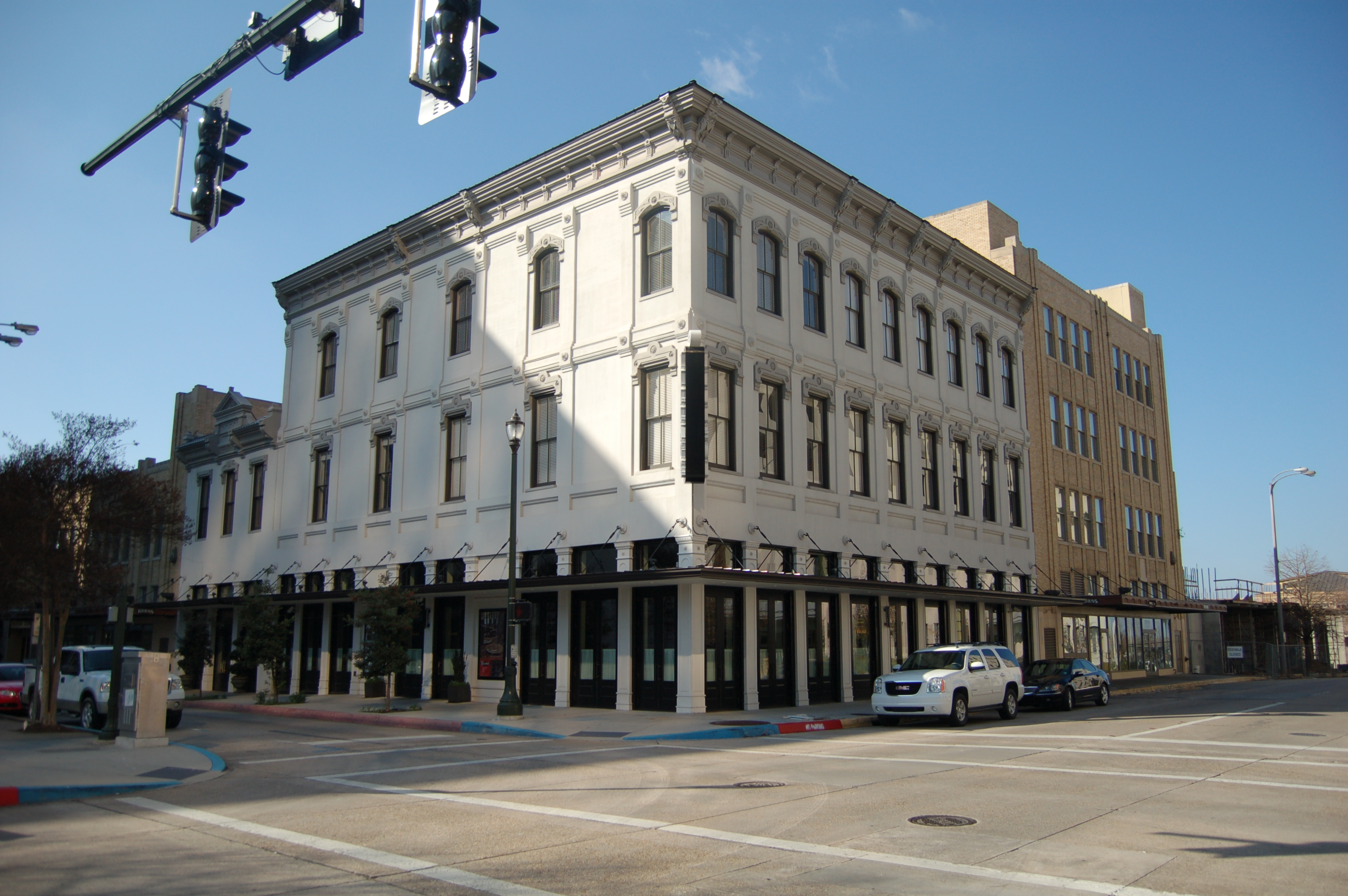
Two-story Knox Building on the left, three-story Welsh-Levy Building at center

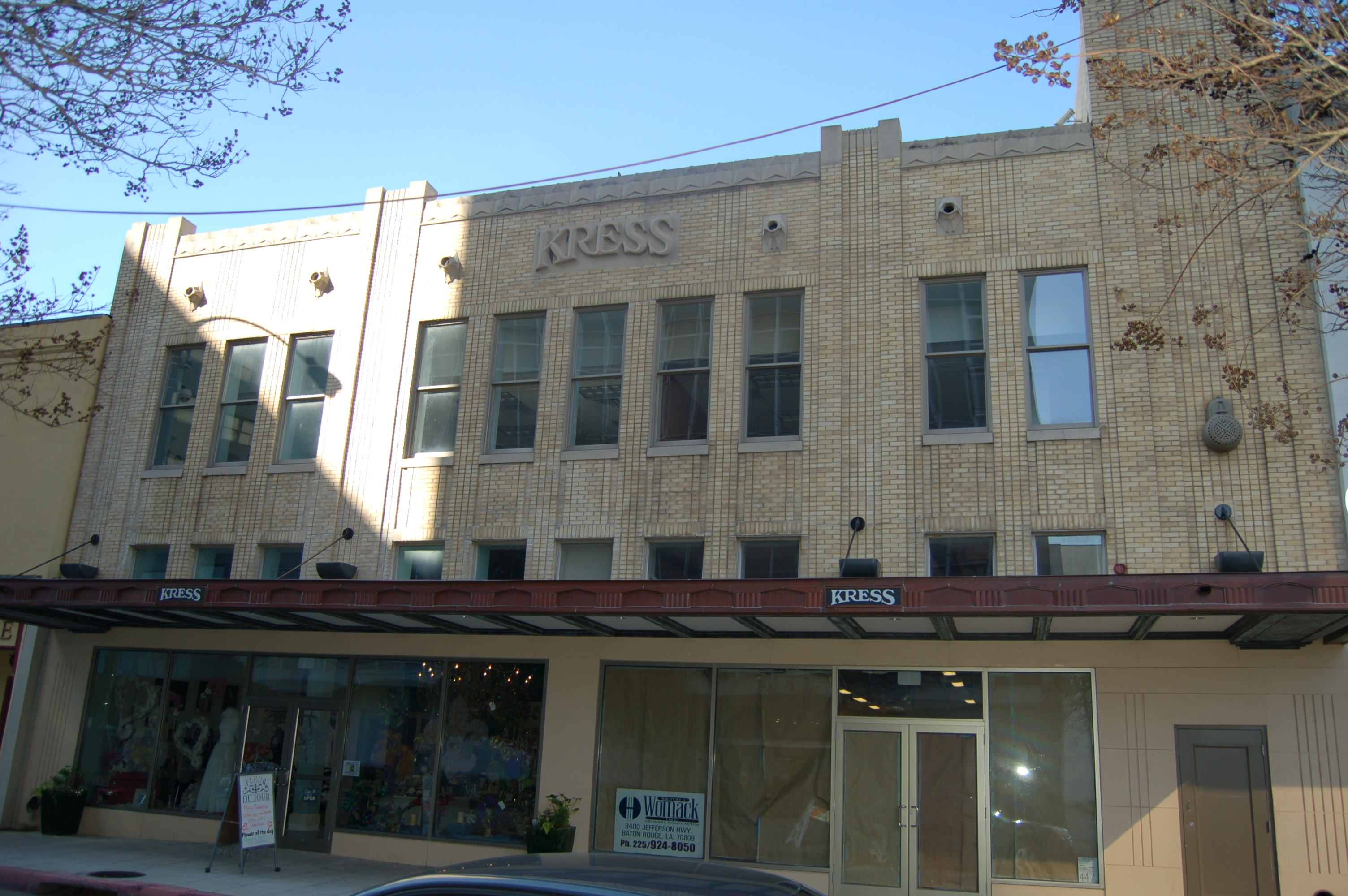
Kress Building

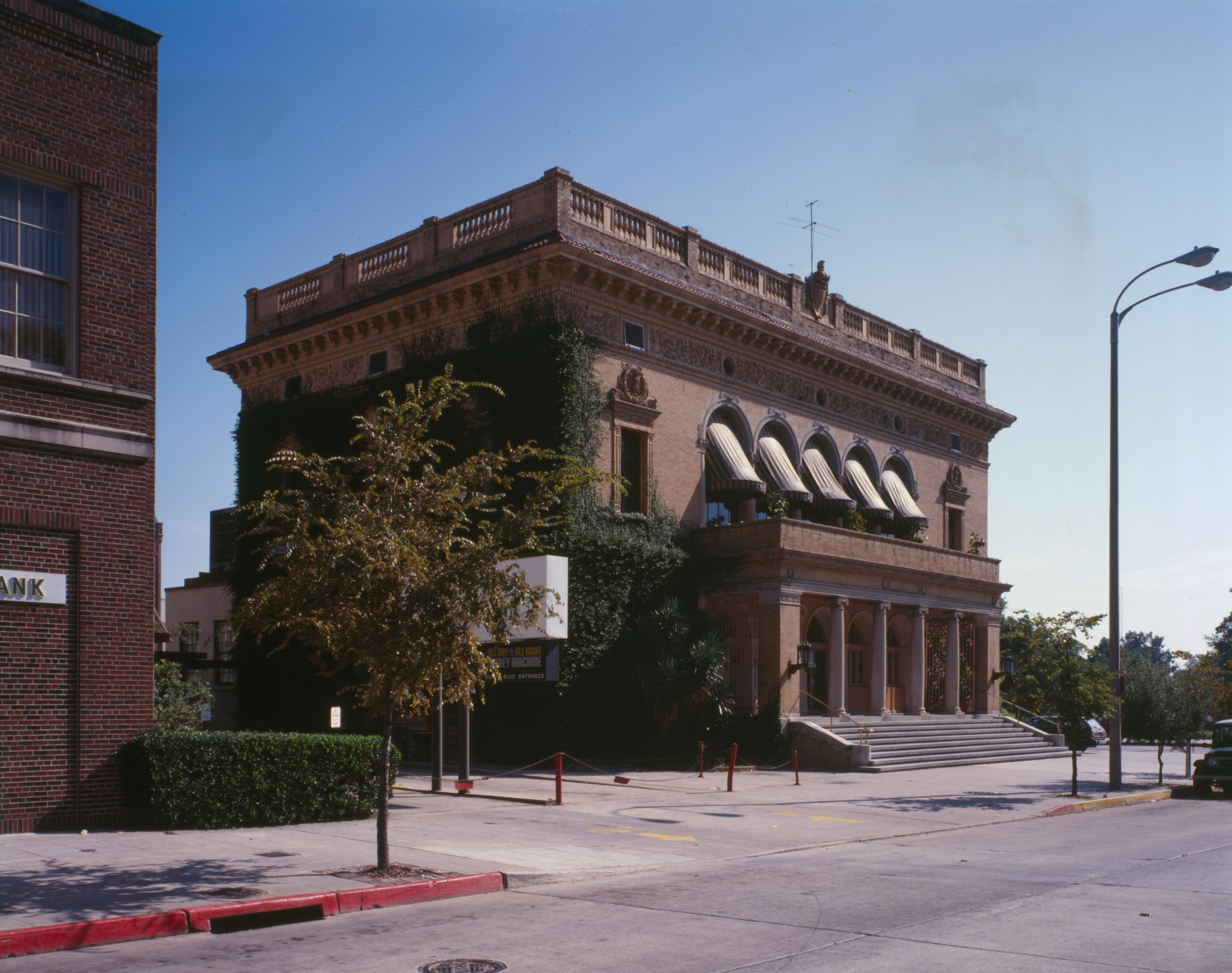
Old Post Office

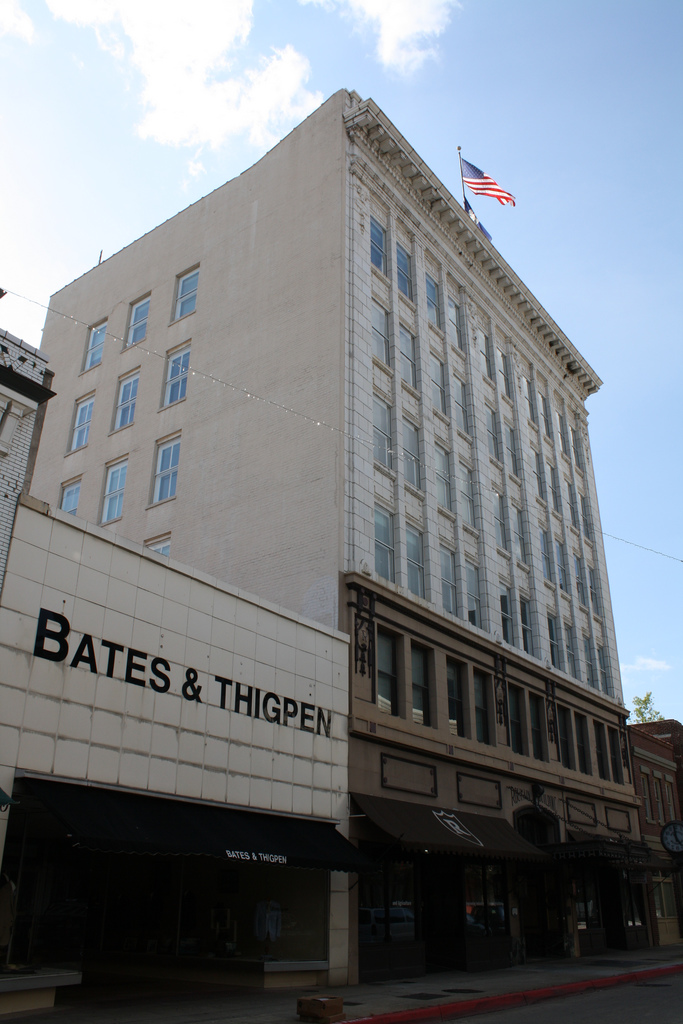
Roumain Building

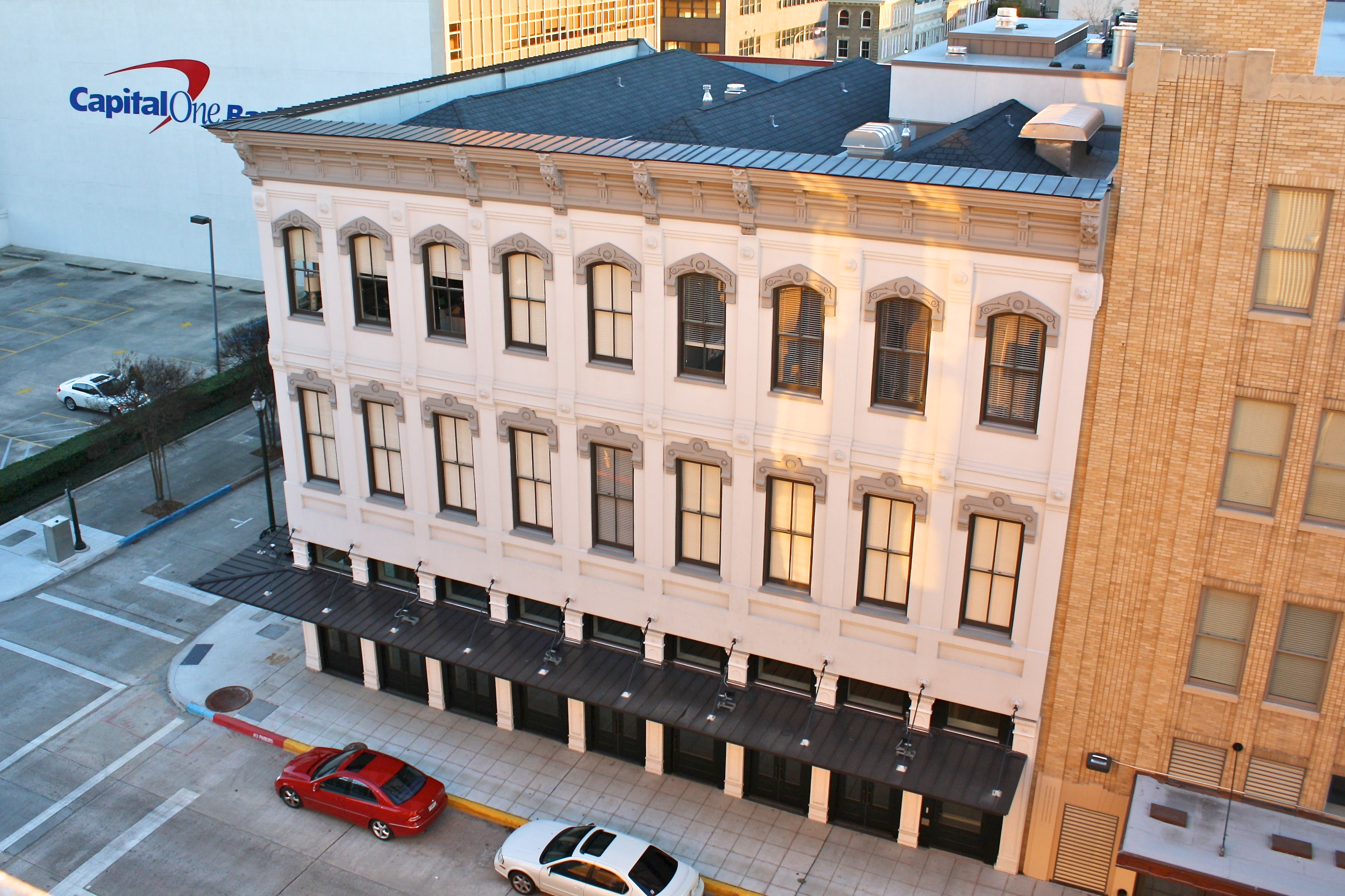
Another view of Welsh-Levy Building

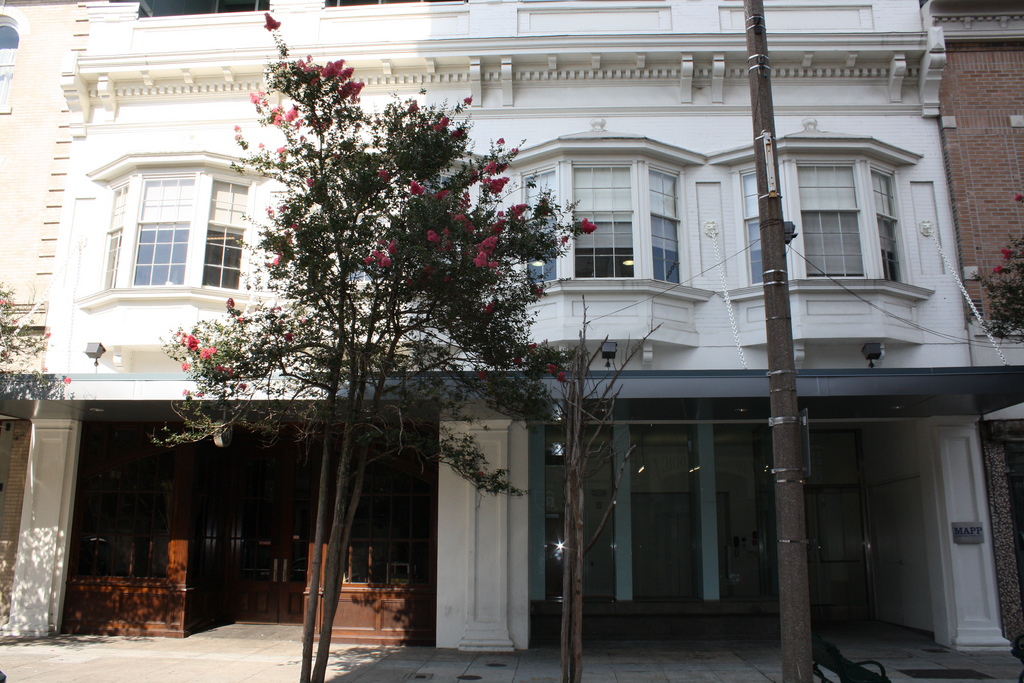
Non-contributing Belisle Building

== See also ==
- Fuqua Hardware Store Building, also included in the historic district
- Knox Building, also included in the historic district
- Kress Building, also included in the historic district
- Old Post Office, also included in the historic district
- Roumain Building, also included in the historic district
- Welsh-Levy Building, also included in the historic district
- National Register of Historic Places listings in East Baton Rouge Parish, Louisiana
