= United States Post Office and Courthouse–Baton Rouge =

- US Post Office and Courthouse--Baton Rouge
- U.S. National Register of Historic Places
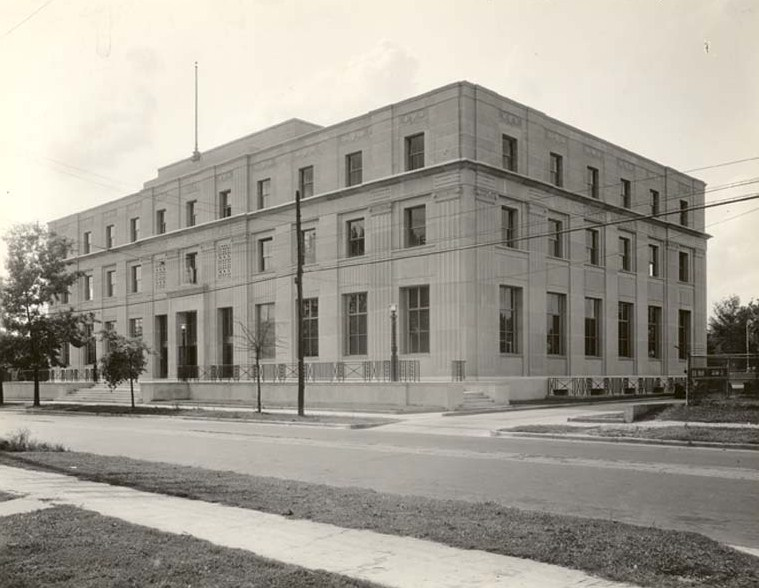
- U.S. Post Office and Court House,

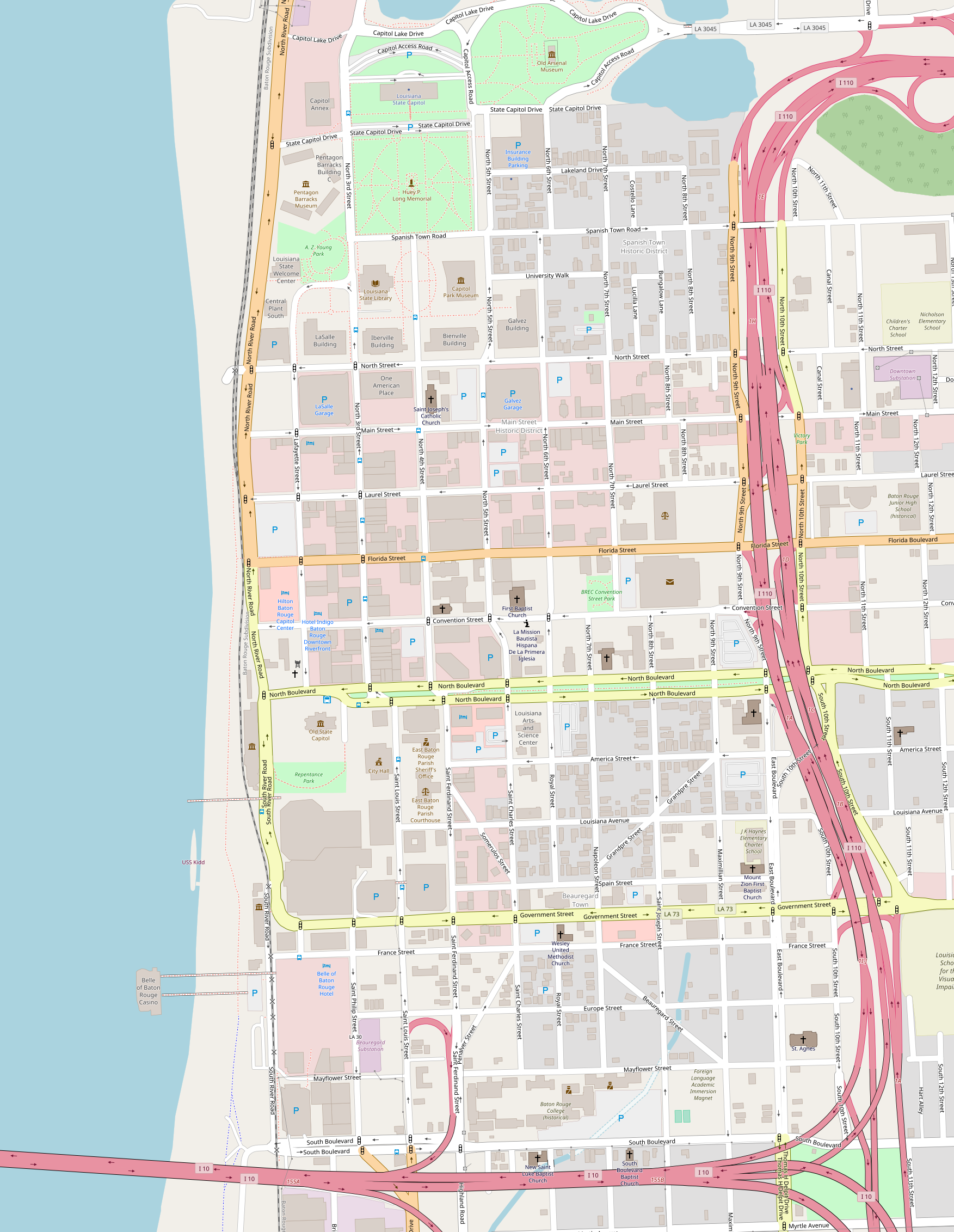
- Location within Baton Rouge Downtown
- Location: 707 Florida Street, Baton Rouge, Louisiana
- Coordinates: 30°26′59″N 91°10′59″W
- Area: less than one acre
- Built: 1932
- Built by: Fred H. Wagner; Jens Braae Jensen; Algernon Blair
- Architect: Moise H. Goldstein; Office of the Supervising Architect under James A. Wetmore
- Architectural style: Art Deco, Moderne
- NRHP reference No.: 00000500
- Added to NRHP: May 18, 2000

The U.S. Post Office and Courthouse-Baton Rouge, also known as Federal Building and U.S. Courthouse, in Baton Rouge, Louisiana, was built in 1932. It includes Art Deco and Moderne architecture. It served historically as a post office, as a courthouse, and as a government office building.

It is a limestone-clad three-story building designed by New Orleans architect Moise H. Goldstein, under the supervision of the Office of the Supervising Architect for the U.S. Treasury department in Art Deco style. It has a slightly projected central bay with four engaged, fluted Ionic pilasters.

The building was listed on the National Register of Historic Places on May 18, 2000.

== See also ==
- National Register of Historic Places listings in East Baton Rouge Parish, Louisiana
- List of United States post offices
