= Pharris =

Pharris is a surname. Notable people with the surname include:

- Chrystee Pharris (born 1976), American actress
- Jackson C. Pharris (1912–1966), United States Navy officer
  - USS Pharris

== See also ==
- Farris (surname)
- Parris
