= USS Reeves (DE-156) =

Buckley-class destroyer escort

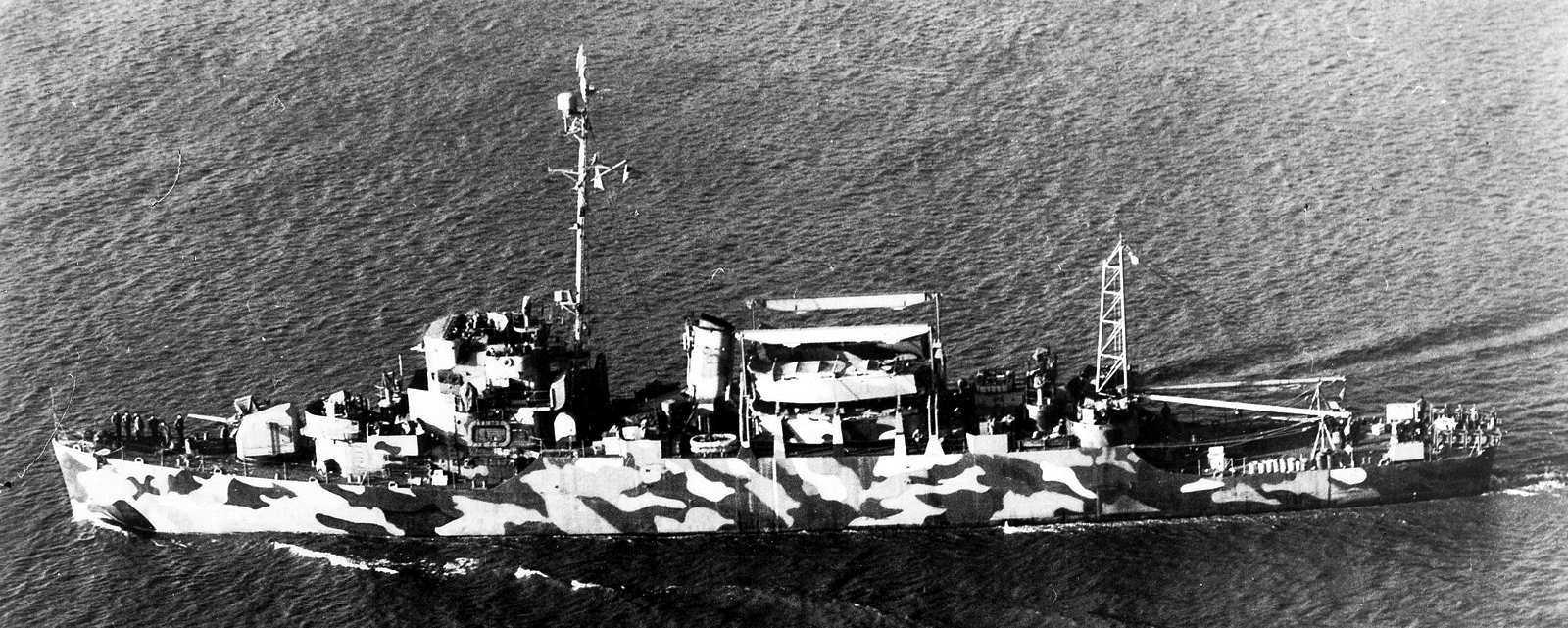
- Reeves on 22 December 1944

History

United States
- Name: USS Reeves
- Namesake: Thomas J. Reeves
- Ordered: 1942
- Builder: Norfolk Navy Yard, Portsmouth, Virginia
- Laid down: 7 February 1943
- Launched: 22 April 1943
- Commissioned: 9 June 1943
- Decommissioned: 30 July 1946
- Reclassified: APD-52, 7 September 1944
- Stricken: 1 June 1960
- Honors and awards: 1 battle star (World War II) Captin= Robert J. Trace
- Fate: Sold to Ecuador, July 1960

General characteristics
- Class & type: Buckley-class destroyer escort
- Displacement: 1,400 long tons (1,422 t) standard; 1,740 long tons (1,768 t) full load
- Length: 306 ft (93 m)
- Beam: 37 ft (11 m)
- Draft: 9 ft 6 in (2.90 m) standard; 11 ft 3 in (3.43 m) full load
- Propulsion: 2 × boilers; General Electric turbo-electric drive; 12,000 shp (8.9 MW); 2 × solid manganese-bronze 3,600 lb (1,600 kg) 3-bladed propellers, 8 ft 6 in (2.59 m) diameter, 7 ft 7 in (2.31 m) pitch; 2 × rudders; 359 tons fuel oil
- Speed: 23 knots (43 km/h; 26 mph)
- Range: 3,700 nmi (6,900 km) at 15 kn (28 km/h; 17 mph); 6,000 nmi (11,000 km) at 12 kn (22 km/h; 14 mph)
- Complement: 15 officers, 198 men
- Armament: 3 × 3"/50 caliber guns; 1 × quad 1.1"/75 caliber gun; 8 × single 20 mm guns; 1 × triple 21 inch (533 mm) torpedo tubes; 1 × Hedgehog anti-submarine mortar; 8 × K-gun depth charge projectors; 2 × depth charge tracks

USS Reeves (DE-156/APD-52) was a Buckley-class destroyer escort in service with the United States Navy from 1943 to 1946. She was transferred to Ecuador for use as an electric generator plant in 1960. Her final fate is unknown.

== History ==
Reeves was named in honor of Chief Petty Officer Thomas J. Reeves (1895–1941), who was killed in action, while serving aboard the battleship California (BB-44) during the attack on Pearl Harbor. For his distinguished conduct to bring ammunition to anti-aircraft guns, he was posthumously awarded the Medal of Honor. The ship was laid down by the Norfolk Navy Yard, Portsmouth, Virginia, on 7 February 1943; launched on 23 April 1943; sponsored by Miss Mary Anne Reeves, niece of Chief Radioman Reeves; and commissioned on 9 June 1943.

Following shakedown, Reeves returned to Norfolk and on 16 August got underway on her first transatlantic escort run, a slow convoy to Casablanca. Arriving at New York six weeks later, she underwent availability and further training, at Casco Bay, then returned to escort duty and for the next 12 months shepherded fast tanker convoys between New York and the United Kingdom. On 18 March 1944, after SS Seakay had been sunk, Reeves rescued 83 of the merchantman's 84-man crew. For heroism during that rescue, one of the escort's coxswains, E. E. Angus, was awarded the Navy and Marine Corps Medal. The following day, Reeves took Donnell (DE-56) in tow after she had been torpedoed, stood by until relieved by tugs, then continued on carrying the damaged escort's more seriously wounded men.

Through D-Day and the summer of 1944, Reeves continued to escort fast convoys. On 23 September she completed her last Atlantic escort mission and entered the Philadelphia Navy Yard for conversion to a Charles Lawrence-class high speed transport.

Redesignated APD-52 on 25 September, Reeves emerged from the shipyard on 23 December and after amphibious training, headed for the Panama Canal and duty in the Pacific. Arriving at Ulithi on 26 February 1945, she continued on to the Philippines in early March to rehearse for Operation Iceberg, the invasion of the Ryukyus.

On 26 March Reeves arrived off the Kerama Retto invasion area and, after initial duties as a standby ship for Underwater Demolition Team operations, shifted to anti-submarine and anti-aircraft screening duties. She served on that harrowing duty for 109 days interrupted only for a fast convoy to Ulithi and a brief availability in the Philippines. Detached 18 August, the APD delivered men, mail, and provisions to ships of the fleet, then sailed north to Japan. There, into October, she assisted in the repatriation of former POWs, including Maj.'Pappy' Boyington. Then supported the United States Strategic Bombing Survey mission assigned to the Nagasaki area. She was the first American ship to drop anchor in Japanese waters (off Tokyo) before the surrender.

Reeves departed for the United States on 26 November and, after stops in the Volcano, Marshall, and Hawaiian Islands, arrived at San Diego on 23 December. Three days later she continued on, and, on 10 January 1946, she arrived at Boston to begin inactivation. Assigned to the Florida Group, Atlantic Reserve Fleet, she decommissioned on 30 July at Green Cove Springs, Florida where she remained until struck from the Navy List on 1 June 1960 and transferred to the Government of Ecuador for use as an electric generator plant.

== Awards ==
Reeves earned one battle star during World War II.
