= Port of Tuxpan =

Tuxpan
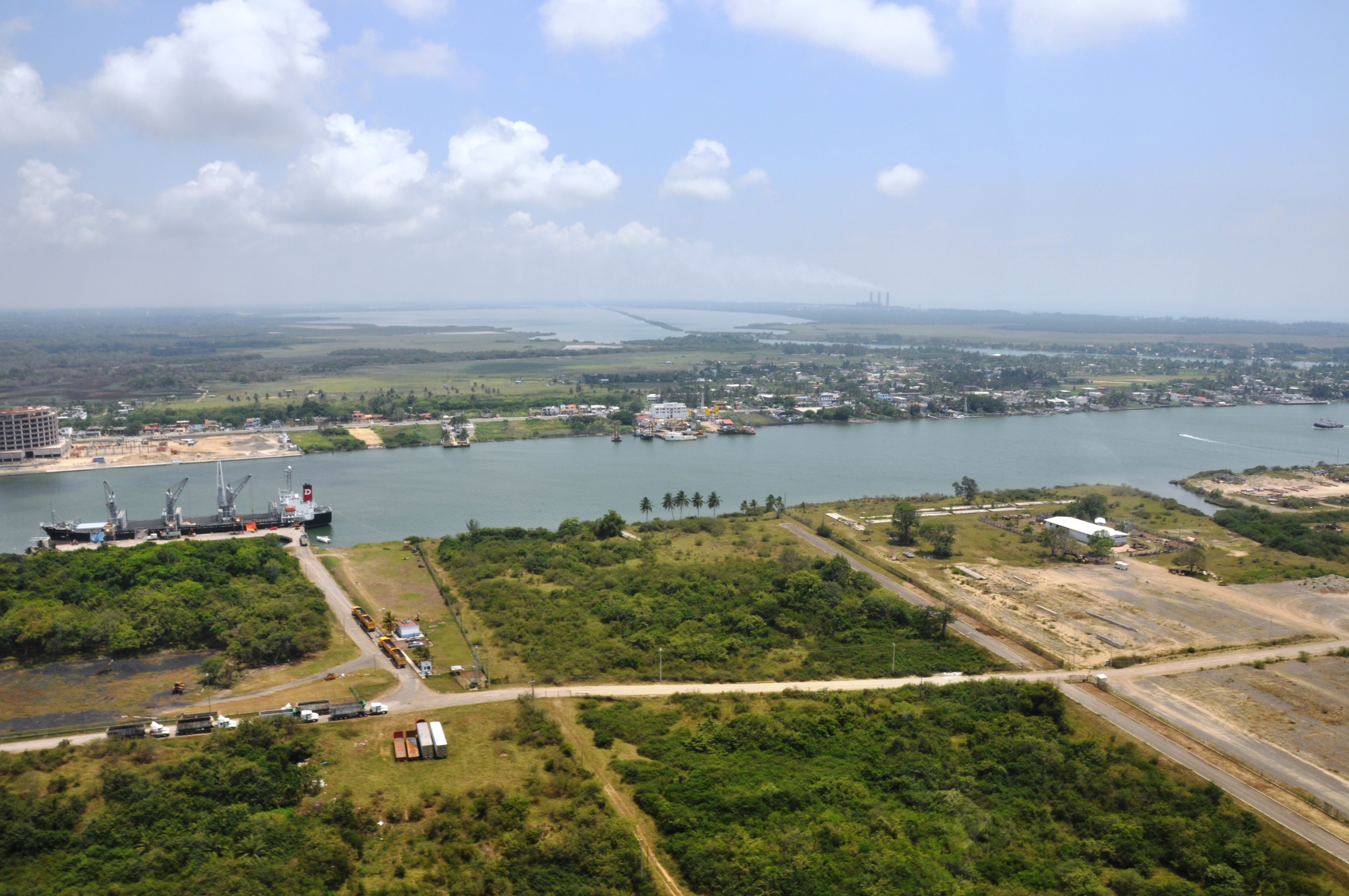
- Interactive map of Tuxpan
- Location in Mexico

Location
- Country: Mexico
- Location: Tuxpan, Veracruz
- Coordinates: 20°57′N 97°20′W
- UN/LOCODE: MXTUX

Details
- No. of berths: 19
- Draft depth: 15.2 metres (50 ft)

Statistics
- Website puertotuxpan.com.mx

The Port of Tuxpan is a port facility on Mexico's Gulf coast. It is located at Tuxpan, Veracruz, 250 kilometres (160 mi) northeast of Mexico City, astride the Tuxpan River.

Tuxpan comprises a combination of river berths and offshore facilities, including facilities for dry and liquid bulk, breakbulk, Ro-Ro and containers, as well as ship-breaking and repair facilities on the river. The offshore oil facilities are located between 3.0 and 6.5 kilometres (1.9 and 4.0 mi) off the coast, north and south of the river mouth.
