= Tuxpan =

Municipality and city in Veracruz, Mexico

- Municipality
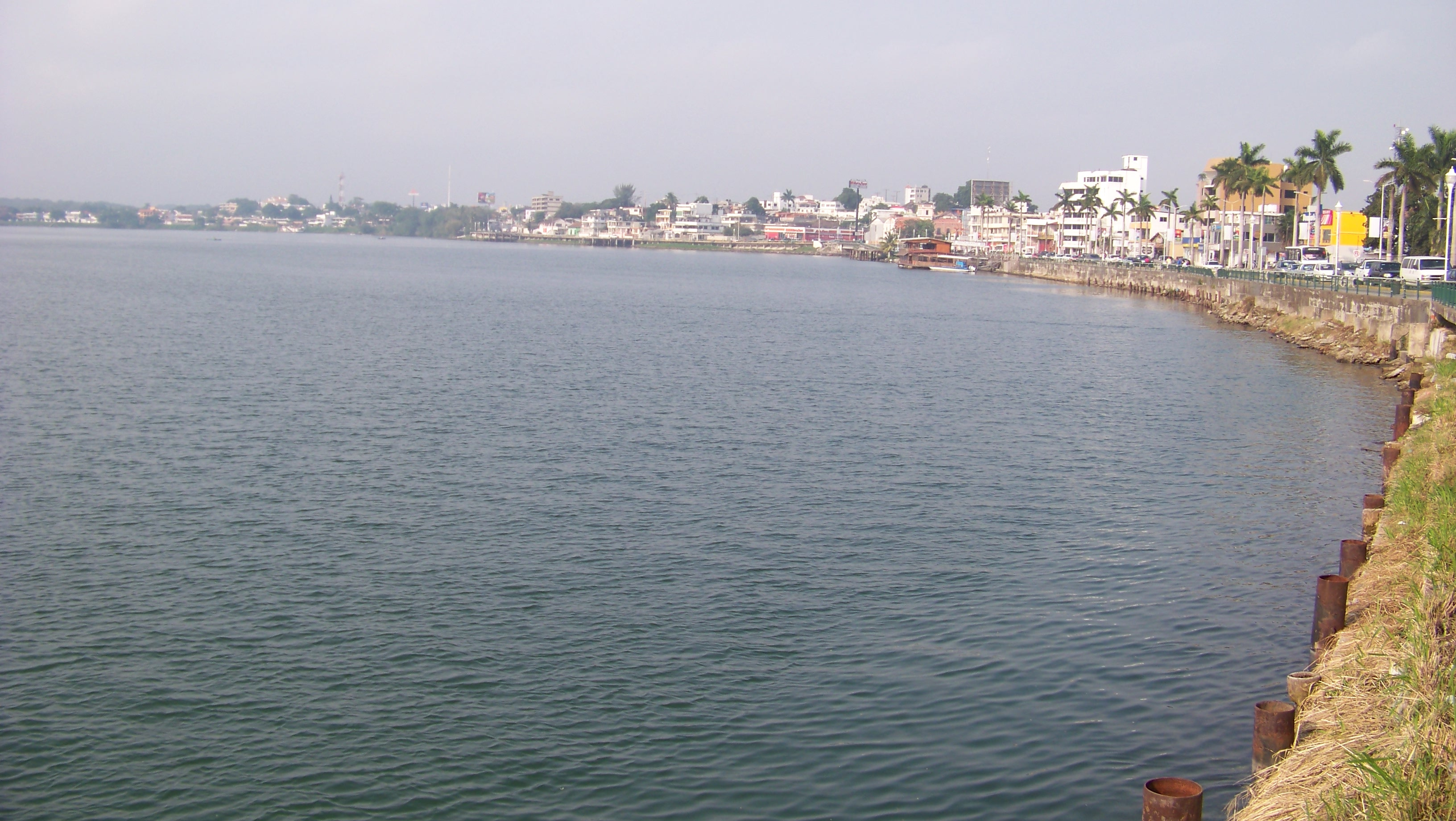
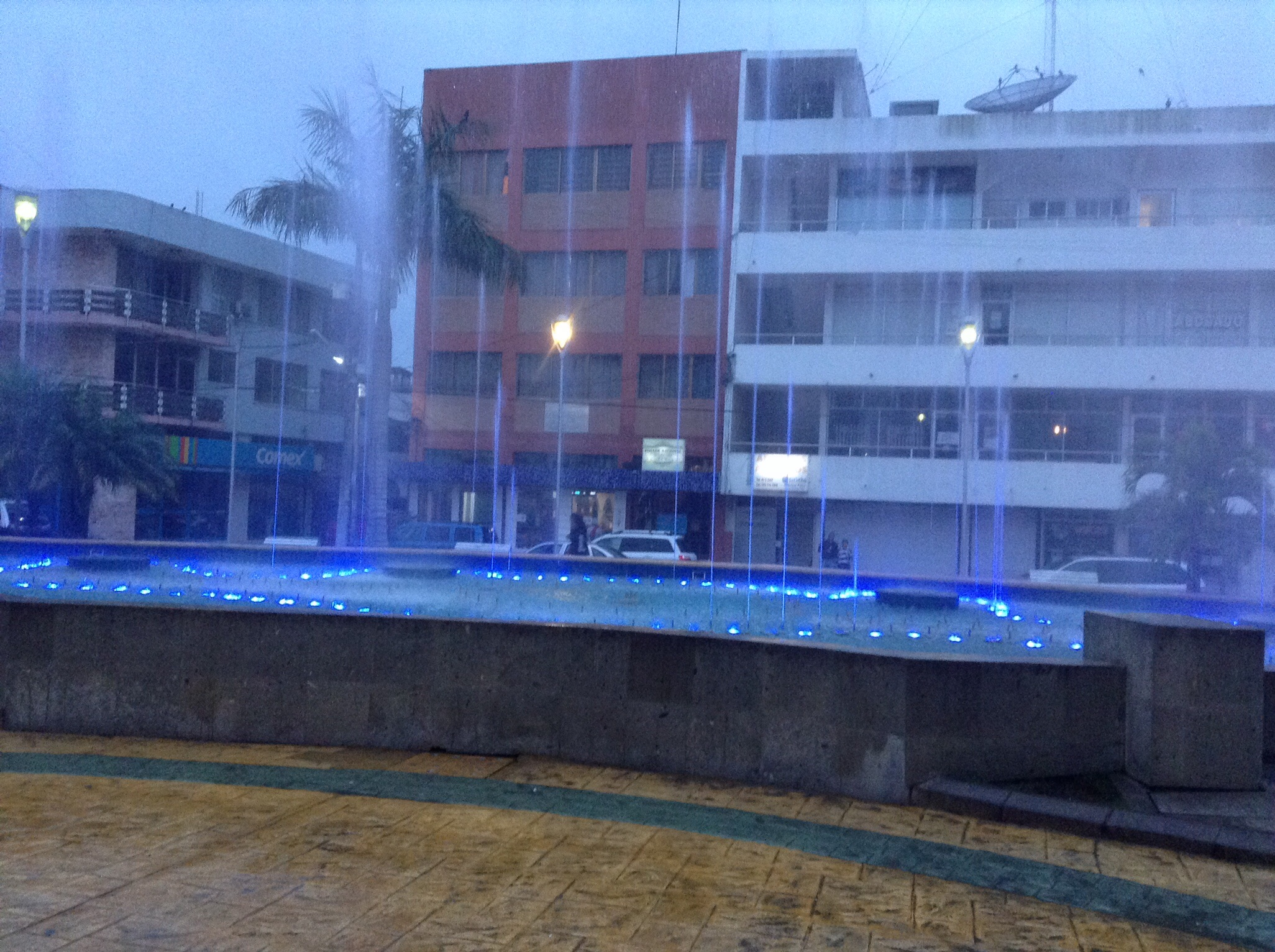
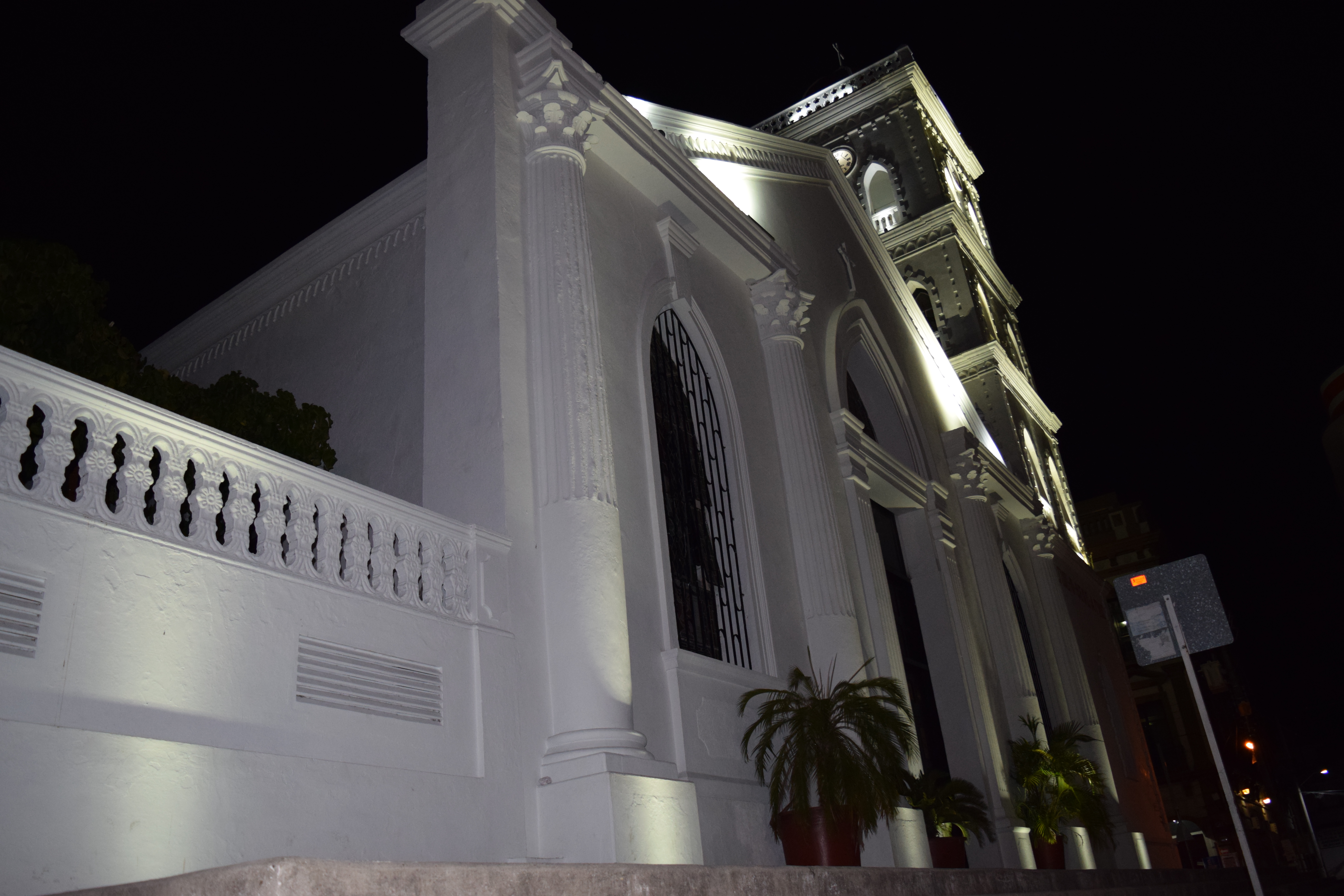
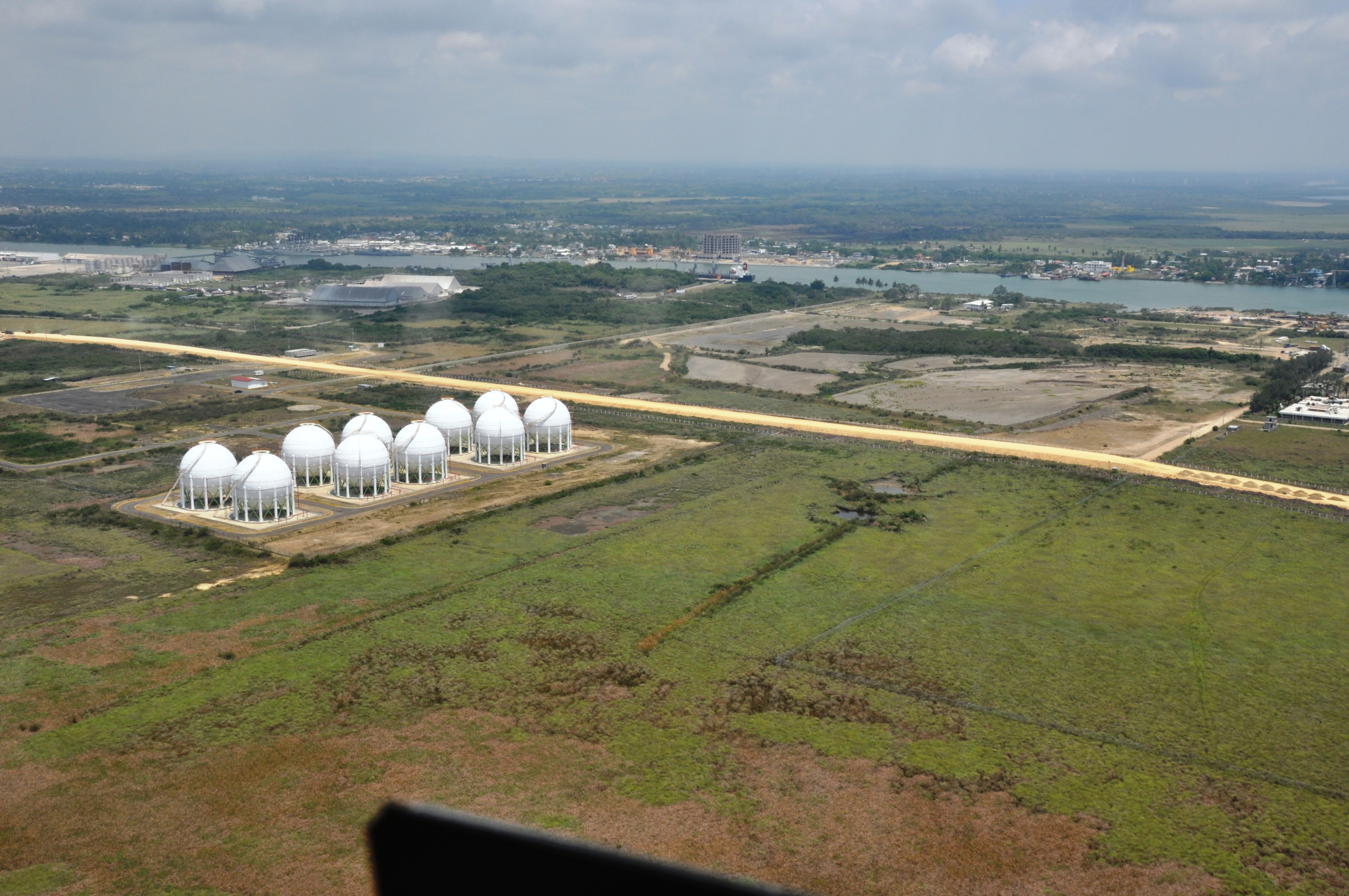
- Top: Tuxpan city skyline from Tuxpan River; Middle: Reforma Hotel, fountains at Downtown; Bottom: Cathedral of the Assumption, Tuxpan port facilities

- Coat of arms

- Location of Tuxpan within the State of Veracruz Location of Tuxpan within Mexico
- Coordinates: 20°57′N 97°24′W
- Country: Mexico
- State: Veracruz
- Region: Huasteca Baja Region

Government
  - Municipal President: Daniel Cortina Martínez

Area
  - Total: 1,061.9 km^{2} (410.0 sq mi)
- Elevation: 10 m (33 ft)

Population (2020)
  - Total: 154,600
  - Seat: 89,557
- Time zone: UTC-6 (CST)
- Website: http://tuxpanveracruz.gob.mx/

Historical population
Year	Pop.	±%
1995	127,622	—
2000	126,616	−0.8%
2005	134,394	+6.1%
2010	143,362	+6.7%
2015	161,829	+12.9%
2020	154,600	−4.5%

Tuxpan (or Túxpam, fully Túxpam de Rodríguez Cano, for Enrique Rodríguez Cano) is both a municipality and city located in the Mexican state of Veracruz. The population of the city was 89,557 and of the municipality was 154,600 inhabitants, according to the 2020 INEGI census, residing in a total area of 1,051.89 km^{2} (406.14 sq mi). The municipality includes many smaller outlying communities, the largest of which are Alto Lucero (20,380 inhabitants) and Santiago de la Peña (8,178 inhabitants). A local beachside community is also nearby.

In the 1870s, a small colony of some hundreds of former Confederate (Southern U.S.) officers, soldiers and diplomats was established.

== Etymology ==
Tuxpan or Túxpam, pronounced [ˈtuʃpan] in Nahuatl, the language of the ancient Nahuas, literally means "Place of Rabbits", a compound of tochtli "rabbit" and -pan "place".

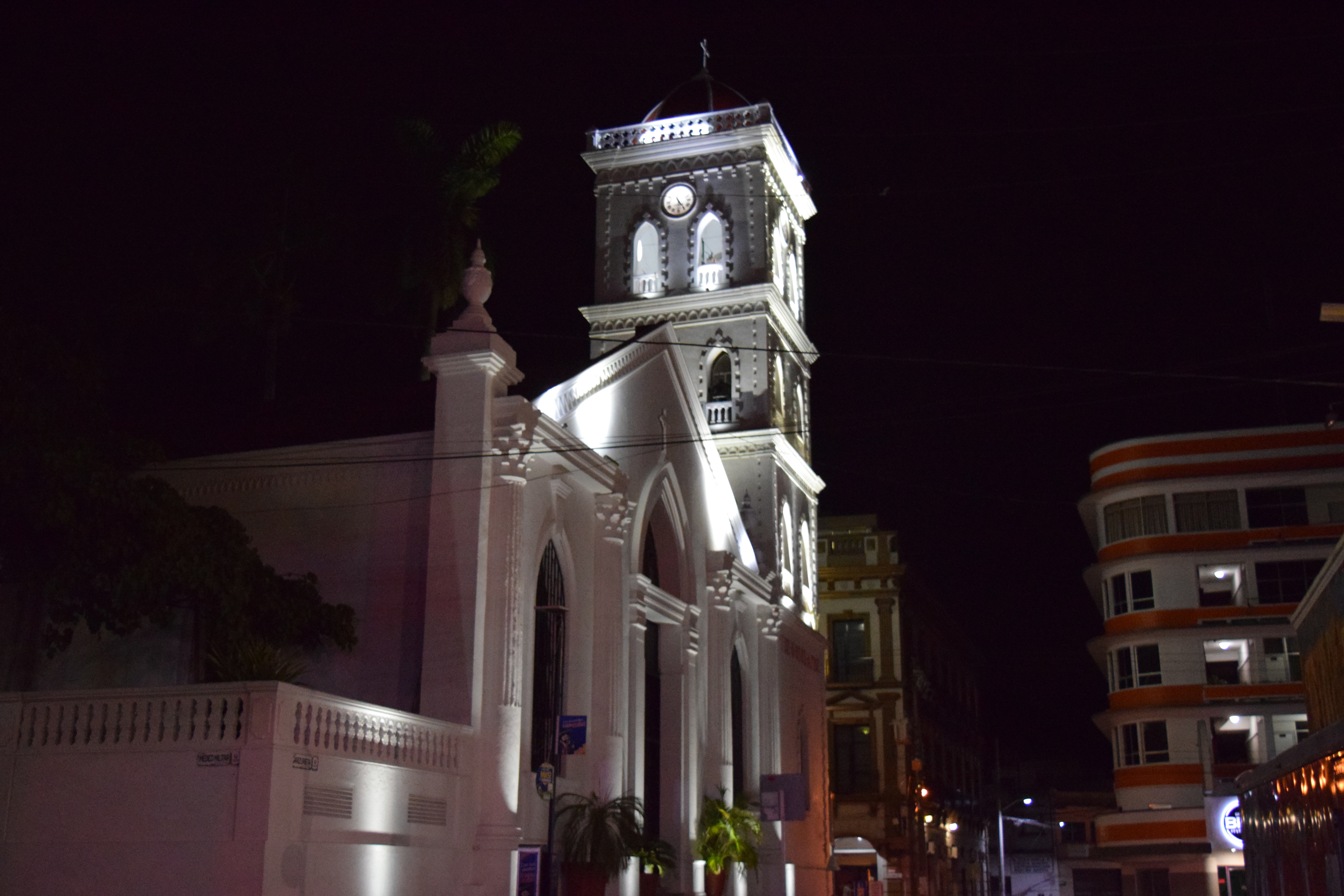
Catedral de Nuestra Señora de la Asunción at night

== History ==
Tochpan was a Huastec settlement. It was a prehispanic commercial center due to its location on the gulf coast, and it held a market every twenty days (corresponding to a veintena) which drew merchants from the Valley of Mexico and Tulancingo. Local resources included wood (such as cedars), chicle, fish, shrimp, and tortoises. It is unclear which Aztec emperor conquered Tochpan, but at some point it was incorporated into the Aztec Empire and became the center of a tributary province that also included Papantla and probably Tuzapán. The province offered clothing, turquoise, jade, feather down, warrior costumes and chilies in tribute to either Tenochtitlan or Tetzcoco. The clothing, feathers and paper were given directly to the departing army. It also provided provisions for Moctezuma I's army. Nezahualcoyotl reportedly received clothing and palace servants from here.

== Economy ==
Being the nearest port to Mexico City, Tuxpan is an important commercial link for Mexican imports and exports. Tuxpan is now primarily a grain port, with emphasis on soybeans and maize. Off-shore links to oil pipelines are used to transfer petroleum products to and from tanker ships operated by Pemex, Mexico's state-owned oil company. As part of the Pemex operations and infrastructure in the city, a facility on the river manufactures and maintains oil rigs for use in the Gulf of Mexico.

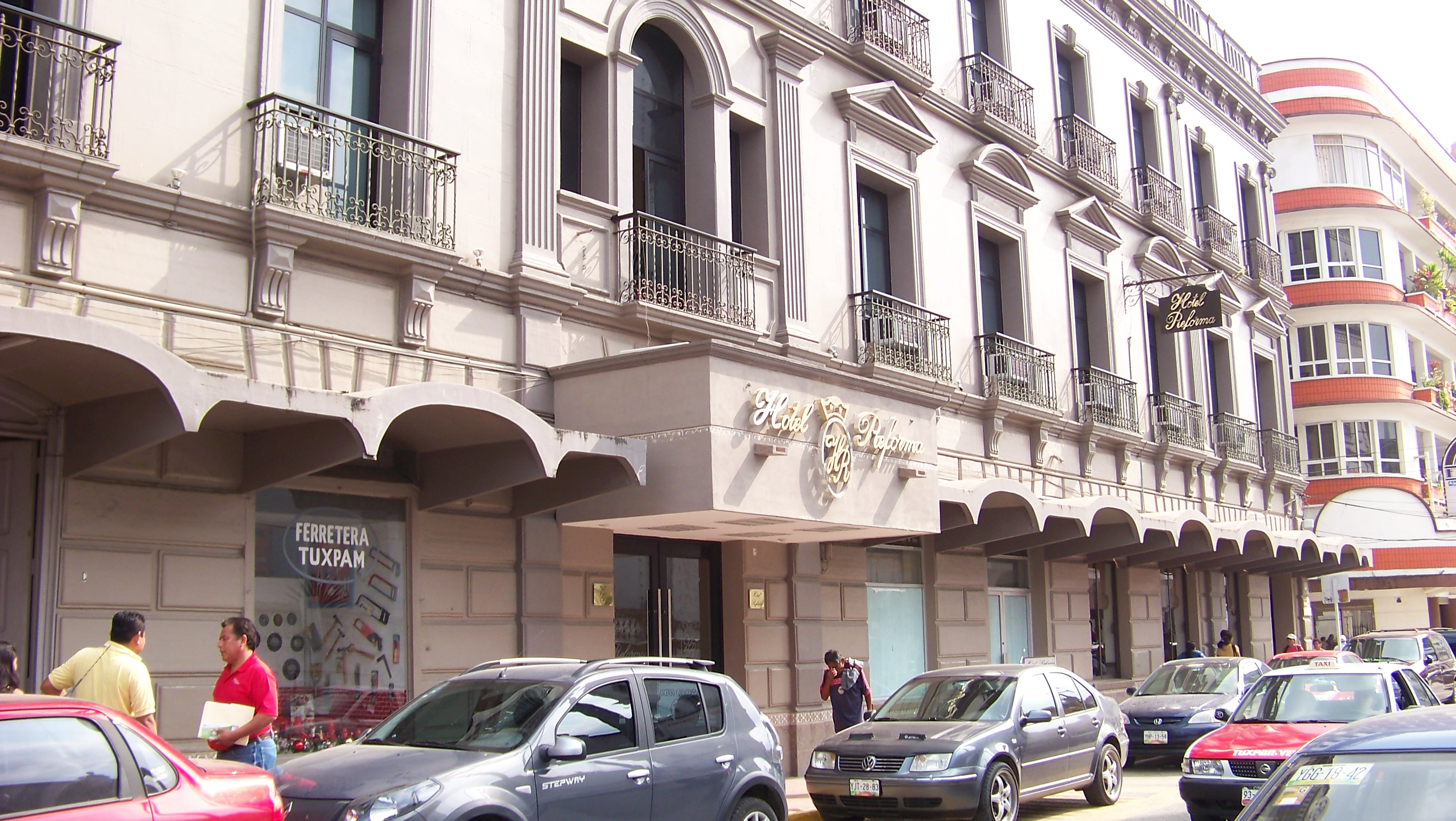
A street in downtown Tuxpan

== Geography ==
The city is located on the banks of the Tuxpan River, which reaches the Gulf of Mexico 11 kilometres (6.8 mi) downstream.

=== Climate ===
Tuxpan experiences a tropical climate with warm winters and hot summers.

Climate data for Túxpam de Rodríguez Cano (1951–2010)
Month	Jan	Feb	Mar	Apr	May	Jun	Jul	Aug	Sep	Oct	Nov	Dec	Year
Record high °C (°F)	41.0 (105.8)	44.0 (111.2)	45.8 (114.4)	43.0 (109.4)	42.0 (107.6)	41.8 (107.2)	41.8 (107.2)	43.5 (110.3)	48.8 (119.8)	41.2 (106.2)	41.8 (107.2)	37.5 (99.5)	48.8 (119.8)
Mean daily maximum °C (°F)	25.0 (77.0)	26.7 (80.1)	29.2 (84.6)	31.7 (89.1)	32.7 (90.9)	33.2 (91.8)	33.0 (91.4)	33.6 (92.5)	33.1 (91.6)	31.5 (88.7)	28.7 (83.7)	26.2 (79.2)	30.4 (86.7)
Daily mean °C (°F)	20.7 (69.3)	22.1 (71.8)	24.5 (76.1)	27.0 (80.6)	28.1 (82.6)	28.7 (83.7)	28.6 (83.5)	28.9 (84.0)	28.4 (83.1)	26.7 (80.1)	24.1 (75.4)	22.0 (71.6)	25.8 (78.4)
Mean daily minimum °C (°F)	16.4 (61.5)	17.6 (63.7)	19.9 (67.8)	22.3 (72.1)	23.5 (74.3)	24.2 (75.6)	24.2 (75.6)	24.2 (75.6)	23.8 (74.8)	22.0 (71.6)	19.5 (67.1)	17.8 (64.0)	21.3 (70.3)
Record low °C (°F)	0.8 (33.4)	7.0 (44.6)	8.8 (47.8)	9.0 (48.2)	8.5 (47.3)	11.5 (52.7)	19.8 (67.6)	14.0 (57.2)	16.0 (60.8)	9.0 (48.2)	6.8 (44.2)	4.5 (40.1)	0.8 (33.4)
Average precipitation mm (inches)	39.5 (1.56)	50.0 (1.97)	38.6 (1.52)	54.1 (2.13)	78.9 (3.11)	207.5 (8.17)	170.8 (6.72)	179.9 (7.08)	266.4 (10.49)	132.2 (5.20)	87.1 (3.43)	50.6 (1.99)	1,355.6 (53.37)
Average precipitation days (≥ 0.1 mm)	8.4	7.3	7.4	6.8	6.7	12.0	13.1	13.9	14.0	11.2	8.0	8.6	117.4
Average relative humidity (%)	81	83	82	82	77	82	82	80	82	83	85	86	82
Mean monthly sunshine hours	112	132	174	168	209	203	211	225	155	174	139	98	2,000
Source 1: Servicio Meteorológico National (humidity 1981–2000)
Source 2: Deutscher Wetterdienst (sun, 1961–1990) (Note: Station ID for Tuxpan, VER. is 76640 Use this station ID to locate the sunshine duration)

== Transport ==
=== Port of Tuxpan ===
Port of Tuxpam
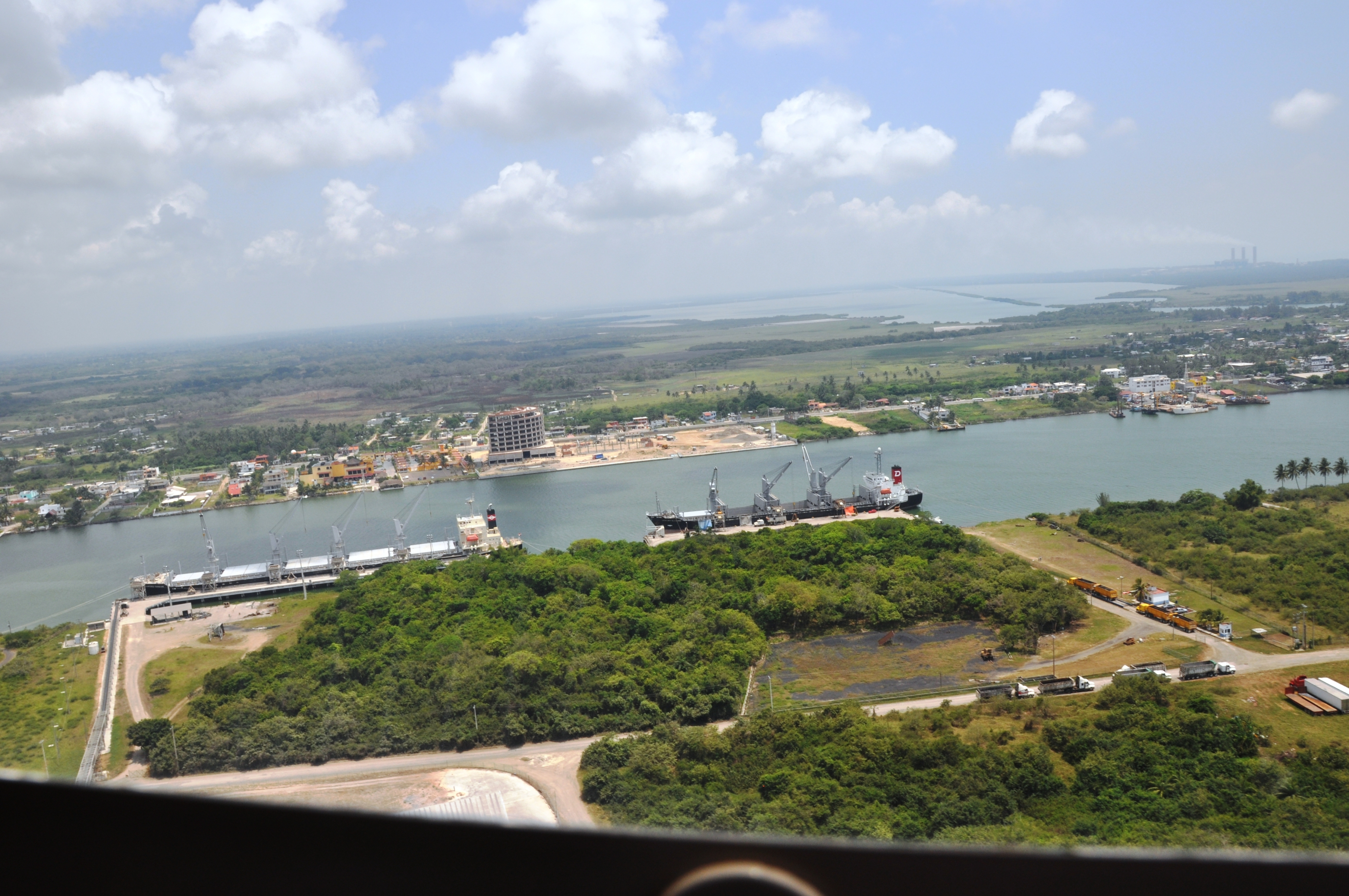
- Tuxpan port facilities
- Interactive map of Port of Tuxpam
- Location within Mexico
- Native name: Puerto de Túxpam (Spanish)

Location
- Coordinates: 20°57′34.59″N 97°19′47.4″W

Sometimes referred to as the "Puerto de Tuxpan", the port is able to handle supertanker-sized cargo ships. Due to increasing commercial shipping traffic in the city of Veracruz, Tuxpan is now the headquarters for the Mexican Navy's Gulf fleet. As such, it is the home port for several warships including three frigates named Allende, Abasolo and Victoria. These ships were originally Knox-class frigates built in the 1960s. They were purchased from the United States Navy in the mid to late 1990s after their decommissioning.

Tuxpan was also the port of departure for the yacht Granma that was used to transport Fidel Castro, his brother Raúl, Che Guevara and other fighters of the Cuban Revolution from Mexico to Cuba in 1956 for the purpose of overthrowing the regime of Fulgencio Batista. A small museum near the river has photographs and other related memorabilia.

== Education ==
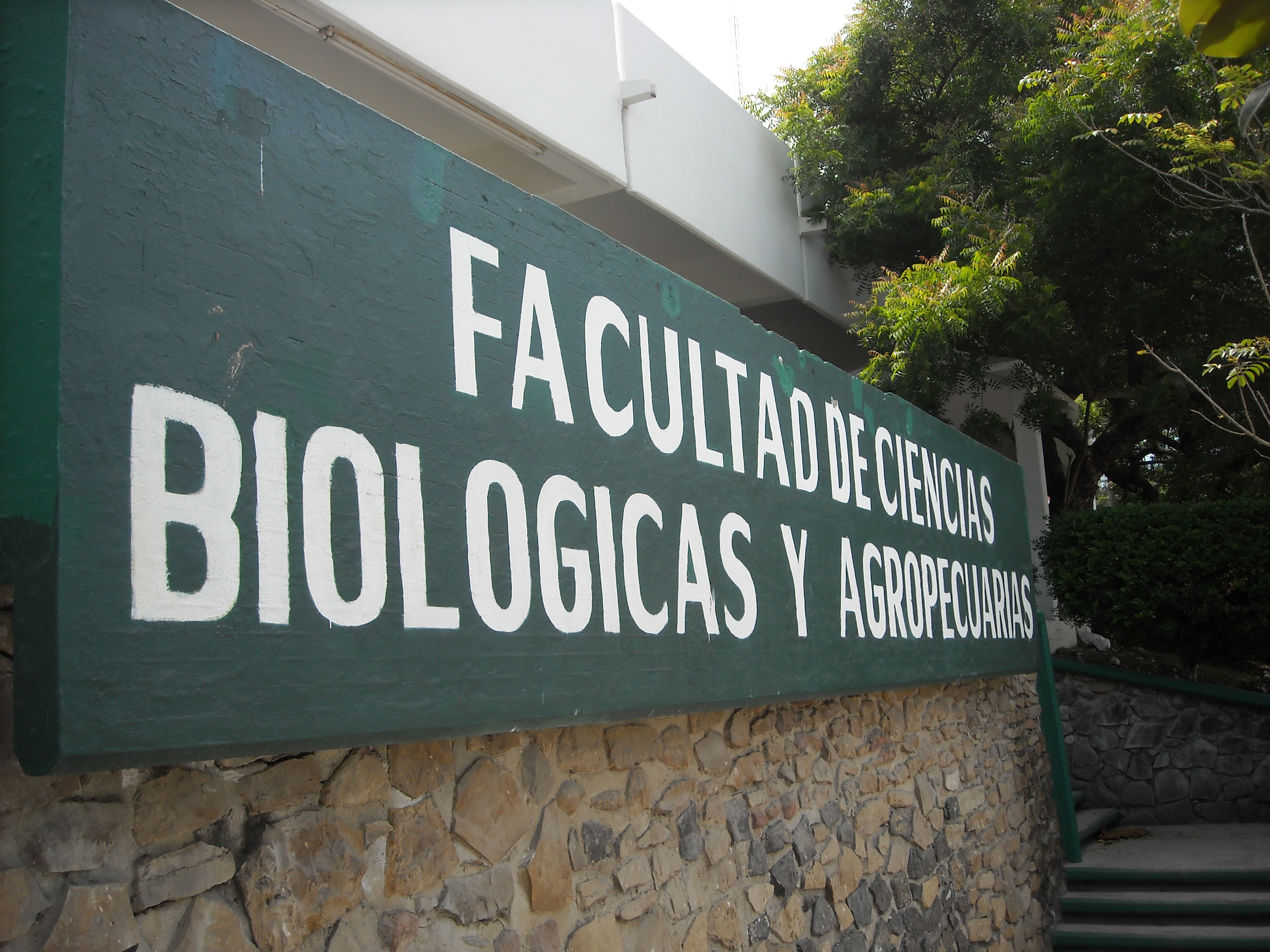
Biological and Agricultural Sciences Faculty at Tuxpan

Universidad Veracruzana has two campus in the city. The first, Biological and Agricultural Sciences Faculty opened in 1975 and offers careers related to the fields of Biology, Veterinary and Agricultural Engineering. The second one, the Accountancy Faculty offers careers related to administration and was opened in 1990.

== Twin Town ==
- Niquero (Granma, Cuba)
