= Thomas James Reeves =

US Navy Medal of Honor recipient (1895–1941)

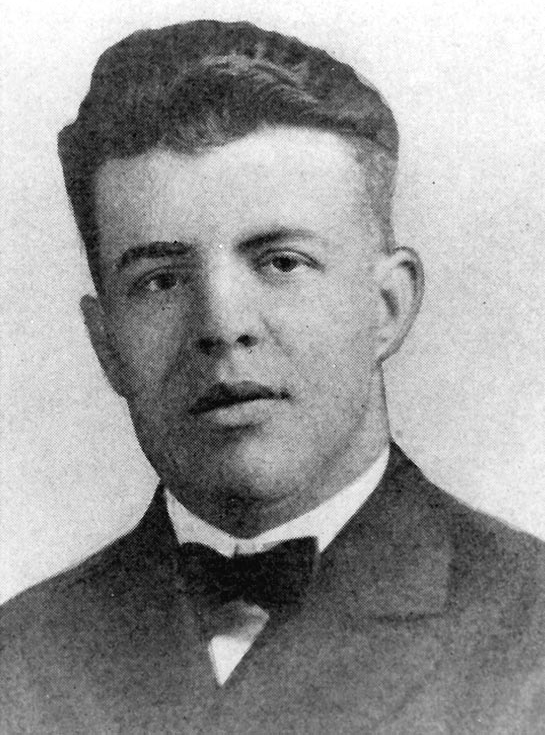
- Chief Radioman Thomas J. Reeves
- Born: December 9, 1895; Thomaston, Connecticut
- Died: December 7, 1941 (aged 45); Pearl Harbor, Territory of Hawaii
- Burial place: National Memorial Cemetery of the Pacific, Honolulu, Hawaii
- Military career
- Allegiance: United States of America
- Branch: United States Navy Reserve; United States Navy
- Service years: 1917 – 1919 (Navy Reserve); 1920 – 1941 (Navy)
- Rank: Chief Radioman
- Unit: USS California (BB-44)
- Conflicts: World War II: Attack on Pearl Harbor †
- Awards: Medal of Honor

Thomas James Reeves, born in Thomaston, Connecticut, December 9, 1895, was a US Navy radioman who became the namesake of the destroyer escort USS Reeves. Reeves was killed during the Japanese surprise attack on Pearl Harbor on December 7, 1941, and posthumously received the Medal of Honor.

== Military service ==
Thomas Reeves enlisted in the United States Naval Reserve as Electrician third class on July 20, 1917. Released from duty July 21, 1919, he was recalled to active duty and was transferred to the regular Navy April 16, 1920 and served until discharged August 21, 1921. On October 12, 1921, he re-enlisted in the Navy making it his career, and advanced through the rates to the warrant officer rank of chief radioman.

Reeves was serving aboard the battleship USS California (BB-44) when the Japanese attacked Pearl Harbor, December 7, 1941. During that attack the mechanized ammunition hoists in the battleship were put out of commission. Reeves "... on his own initiative, in a burning passageway, assisted in the maintenance of an ammunition supply by hand to the antiaircraft guns until he was overcome by smoke and fire which resulted in his death." For his distinguished conduct, RMC Reeves posthumously received the Medal of Honor.

== Namesake ==
In 1943, the destroyer escort USS Reeves (DE-156) was named in his honor.

== Medal of Honor citation ==
Citation:

For distinguished conduct in the line of his profession, extraordinary courage and disregard of his own safety during the attack on the Fleet in Pearl Harbor, by Japanese forces on 7 December 1941. After the mechanized ammunition hoists were put out of action in the U.S.S. California, Reeves, on his own initiative, in a burning passageway, assisted in the maintenance of an ammunition supply by hand to the antiaircraft guns until he was overcome by smoke and fire, which resulted in his death.

== Awards and decorations ==
CPO Reeves received the following awards for his service.

1st row	Medal of Honor		
2nd row	Purple Heart	Combat Action Ribbon	Navy Good Conduct Medal with 6 Service stars
3rd row	Navy Expeditionary Medal	World War I Victory Medal with 'Transport' Clasp	American Defense Service Medal with Fleet clasp
4th row	American Campaign Medal	Asiatic-Pacific Campaign Medal with 1 Campaign star	World War II Victory Medal

== See also ==
- List of Medal of Honor recipients
