= USS California (BB-44) =

Dreadnought battleship of the United States Navy

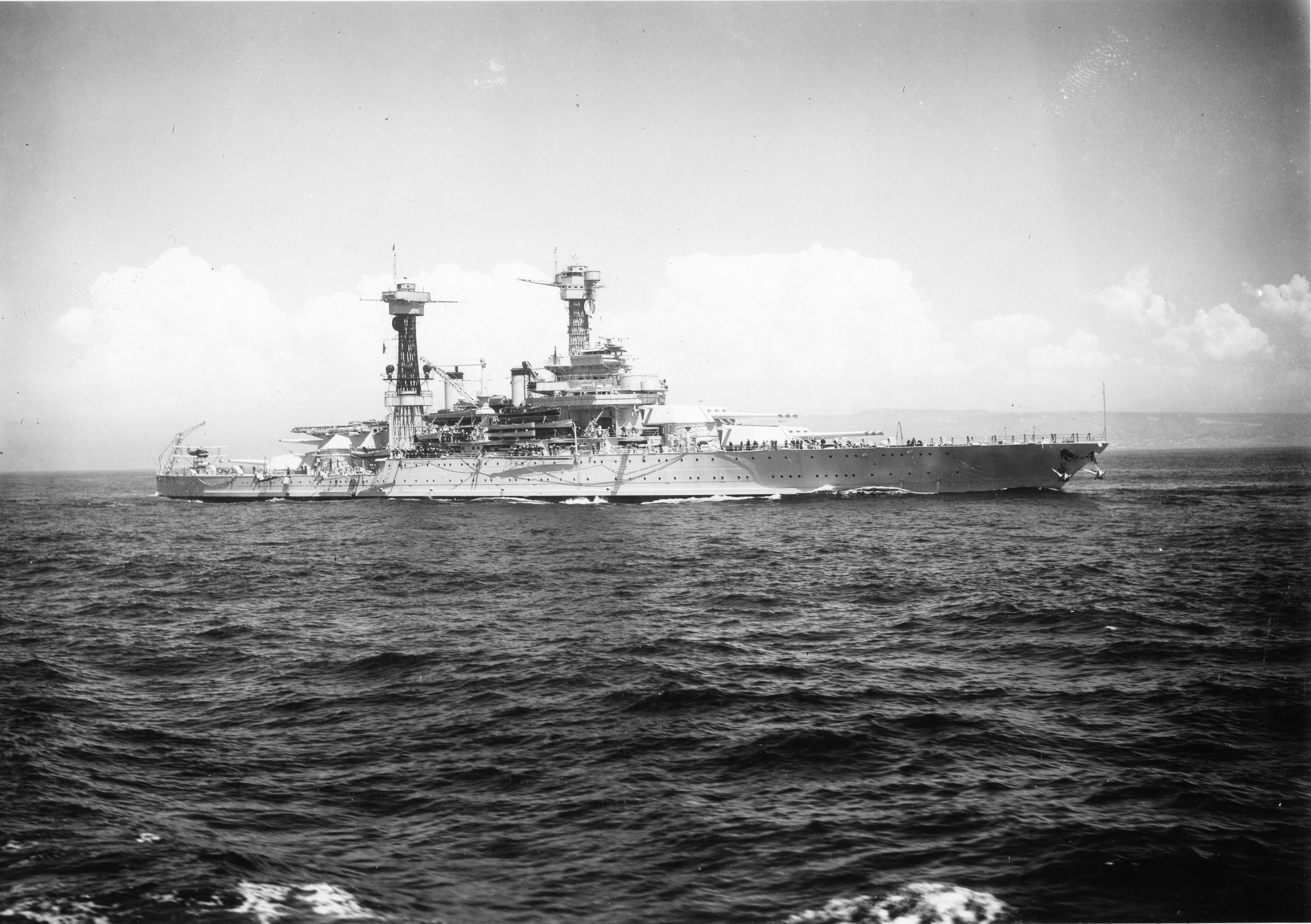
- USS California (BB-44) at sea, mid-1930s

History

United States
- Name: California
- Namesake: California
- Ordered: 28 December 1915
- Builder: Mare Island Naval Shipyard, Vallejo, California
- Laid down: 25 October 1916
- Launched: 20 November 1919
- Commissioned: 10 August 1921
- Decommissioned: 14 February 1947
- Stricken: 1 March 1959
- Identification: Hull symbol: BB-44
- Fate: Broken up, 1959

General characteristics (as built)
- Class & type: Tennessee-class battleship
- Displacement: Normal: 32,300 long tons (32,818 t); Full load: 33,190 long tons (33,723 t)
- Length: 600 ft (180 m) lwl; 624 ft (190 m) loa
- Beam: 97 ft 5 in (29.69 m)
- Draft: 30 ft 2 in (9.19 m)
- Installed power: 8 × Babcock & Wilcox boilers; 28,600 shp (21,300 kW)
- Propulsion: 2 × Westinghouse electric generators; 4 × electric motors; 4 × screw propellers
- Speed: 21 knots (39 km/h; 24 mph)
- Range: 8,000 nmi (15,000 km; 9,200 mi) at 10 knots (19 km/h; 12 mph)
- Complement: 57 officers; 1,026 enlisted
- Armament: 4 × triple 14 in (356 mm) guns; 14 × single 5 in (127 mm) guns; 4 × single 3 in (76 mm) guns; 2 × 21 in (533 mm) torpedo tubes
- Armor: Belt: 8–13.5 in (203–343 mm); Barbettes: 13 in (330 mm); Turret face: 18 in (457 mm); Conning tower: 16 in (406 mm); Decks: 3.5 in (89 mm)

General characteristics (1943)
- Displacement: 34,858 long tons (35,417 t) (design); 40,345 long tons (40,992 t) (full load)
- Complement: 114 officers; 2,129 enlisted
- Armament: 4 × triple 14 in guns; 8 × twin 5 in/38 cal guns; 11 × quadruple, 6 × twin 40 mm (1.6 in) AA guns; 43 × single 20 mm (0.79 in) AA guns
- Aircraft carried: 3 × floatplanes
- Aviation facilities: 2 × catapults

USS California, hull number BB-44, was the second of two Tennessee-class battleships built for the United States Navy between her keel laying in October 1916 and her commissioning in August 1921. The Tennessee class was part of the standard series of twelve battleships built in the 1910s and 1920s, and were developments of the preceding New Mexico class. They were armed with a battery of twelve 14-inch (356 mm) guns in four three-gun turrets. California served as the flagship of the Battle Fleet in the Pacific Ocean for the duration of her peacetime career. She spent the 1920s and 1930s participating in routine fleet training exercises, including the annual Fleet Problems, and cruises around the Americas and further abroad, such as a goodwill visit to Australia and New Zealand in 1925.

California was moored in Pearl Harbor on 7 December 1941 when the Japanese attacked the port, bringing the United States into World War II. The ship was moderately damaged by a pair of torpedoes and a bomb, but a fire disabled the ship's electrical system, preventing the pumps from being used to keep the ship afloat. California slowly filled with water over the following three days and eventually sank. Her crew suffered 165 casualties and four men were awarded the Medal of Honor for their actions during the attack. She was raised in April 1942, repaired and heavily rebuilt, and returned to service in January 1944.

The ship thereafter supported the amphibious operations conducted during the Pacific War, including the Mariana and Palau Islands campaign (though she was damaged in a collision with Tennessee and thus missed the Battle of Peleliu) and the Philippines campaign, during which she took part in the Battle of Surigao Strait. She was hit by a kamikaze during the invasion of Lingayen Gulf in January 1945, but after undergoing repairs, she rejoined the fleet supporting troops fighting on Okinawa during the Battle of Okinawa. Her crew took part in the occupation of Japan after the end of the war, and after returning to the United States via the Indian and Atlantic Oceans, was laid up in Philadelphia in 1946. She remained in the fleet's inventory until 1959, when she was broken up for scrap.

== Design ==
The two Tennessee-class battleships were authorized on 3 March 1915, and they were in most respects repeats of the earlier New Mexico-class battleships, the primary differences being enlarged bridges, greater elevation for the main battery turrets, and relocation of the secondary battery to the upper deck.

California was 624 feet (190 m) long overall and had a beam of 97 ft 5 in (29.69 m) and a draft of 30 ft 2 in (9.19 m). She displaced 32,300 long tons (32,800 t) as designed and up to 33,190 long tons (33,720 t) at full combat load. The ship was powered by four-shaft General Electric turbo-electric transmission and eight oil-fired Babcock & Wilcox boilers rated at 26,800 shaft horsepower (20,000 kW), generating a top speed of 21 knots (39 km/h; 24 mph). The ship had a cruising range of 8,000 nautical miles (15,000 km; 9,200 mi) at a speed of 10 kn (19 km/h; 12 mph). Her crew numbered 57 officers and 1,026 enlisted men. As built, she was fitted with two lattice masts with spotting tops for the main battery.

The ship was armed with a main battery of twelve 14-inch (356 mm)/50 caliber guns (Note: /50 caliber refers to the length of the gun in terms of caliber. The length of a /50 caliber gun is 50 times its bore diameter.) in four, three-gun turrets on the centerline, placed in two superfiring pairs forward and aft of the superstructure. Unlike earlier American battleships with triple turrets, these mounts allowed each barrel to elevate independently. The secondary battery consisted of fourteen 5-inch (127 mm)/51 caliber guns mounted in individual casemates clustered in the superstructure amidships. Initially, the ship was to have been fitted with twenty-two of the guns, but experiences in the North Sea during World War I demonstrated that the additional guns, which would have been placed in the hull, would have been unusable in anything but calm seas. As a result, the casemates were plated over to prevent flooding. The secondary battery was augmented with four 3-inch (76 mm)/50 caliber guns. In addition to her gun armament, California was also fitted with two 21-inch (530 mm) torpedo tubes, mounted submerged in the hull, one on each broadside.

The main armored belt was 8–13.5 in (203–343 mm) thick, while the main armored deck was up to 3.5 in (89 mm) thick. The main battery gun turrets had 18 in (457 mm) thick faces on 13 in (330 mm) barbettes. The conning tower had 16 in (406 mm) thick sides.

== Service history ==
=== Prewar service ===
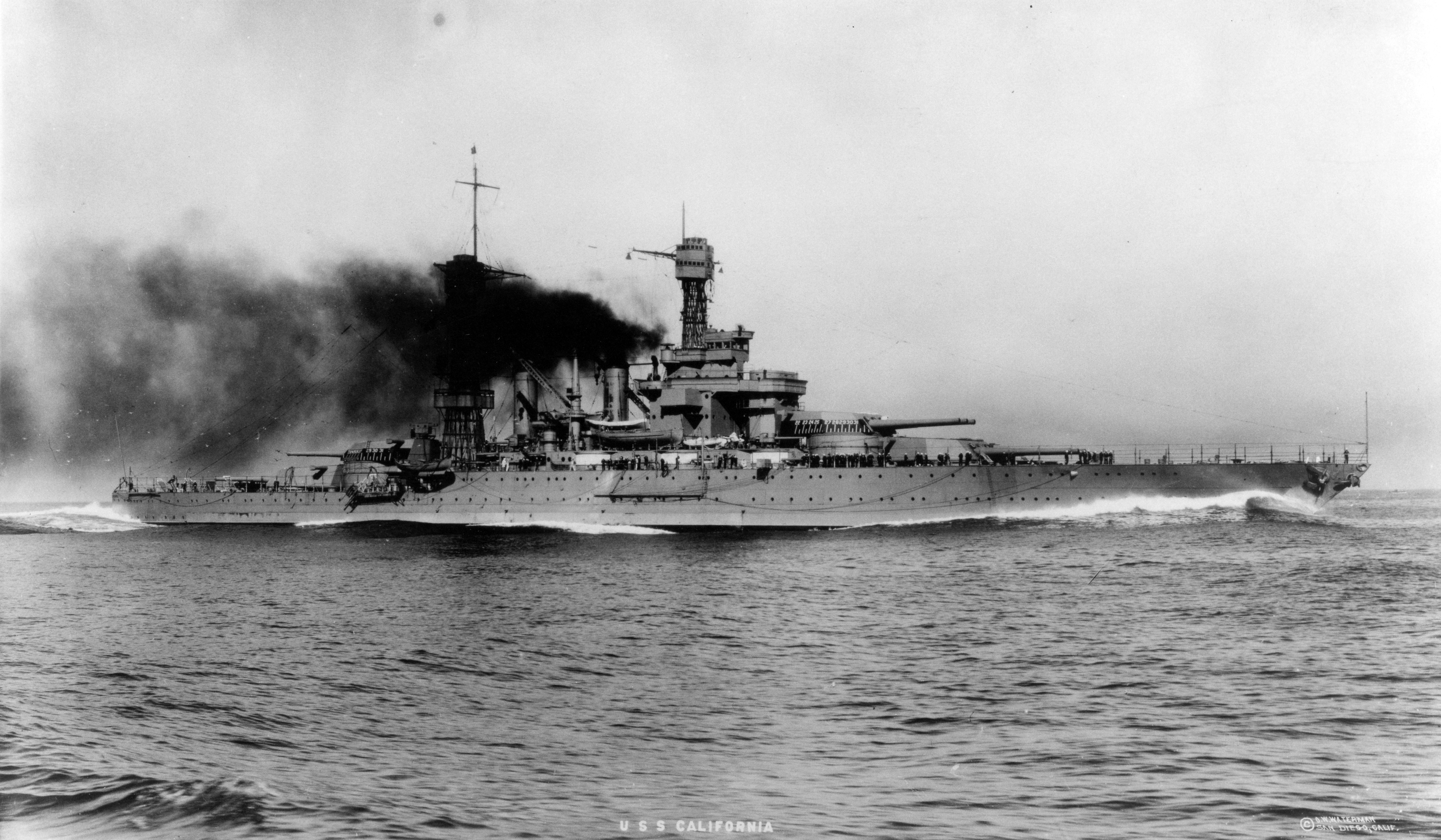
At high speed, 1921

California's keel was laid down on 25 October 1916 at the Mare Island Naval Shipyard in Vallejo, California. Work was halted for a short time during World War I while the shipyard focused on outfitting smaller craft. She was launched 20 November 1919 and commissioned on 10 August 1921. On entering service, she joined the Battle Fleet, serving as its flagship. For the duration of her peacetime career, California was occupied with routine training exercises, including joint Army-Navy maneuvers and the annual fleet problems. On the night of 11 November 1924, Lieutenant Dixie Kiefer took off from the ship, the first night aircraft launch in history. Further experimentation with aircraft continued in early 1925, when the ships of the Battle Fleet received a squadron of Curtiss TS-1 floatplanes on 31 March. In mid-1925, the Battle Fleet crossed the Pacific Ocean on a goodwill cruise to Australia and New Zealand; on the way, the ships stopped in Pago Pago, American Samoa. California underwent a refit at the Puget Sound Navy Yard at Bremerton, Washington later that year.

In 1926, California had an aircraft catapult installed on one of her main battery turrets, and she carried up to three Vought UO-1 floatplanes. She participated in a naval review for President Calvin Coolidge held off Hampton Roads, Virginia on 4 June 1927. In late 1929 and early 1930, the ship received a new battery of eight 5-inch (127 mm)/25 cal guns on anti-aircraft mounts in place of the old 3-inch guns. She took part in Fleet Problem X, conducted in the Caribbean Sea, from 10 to 15 March 1930. Fleet Problem XI followed, again in the Caribbean, from 14 to 18 April. After the conclusion of the exercises, California steamed north to New York City, thereafter joining a naval review for President Herbert Hoover off the Virginia Capes on 20 May. The ship then returned to the Pacific and after arriving, visited Port Angeles, Washington from 7 to 11 July. She operated off Puget Sound through 11 August before steaming south to San Francisco, where she stayed from 17 to 24 August. In early 1931, she and the rest of the Battle Fleet steamed south to the Panama Canal zone.

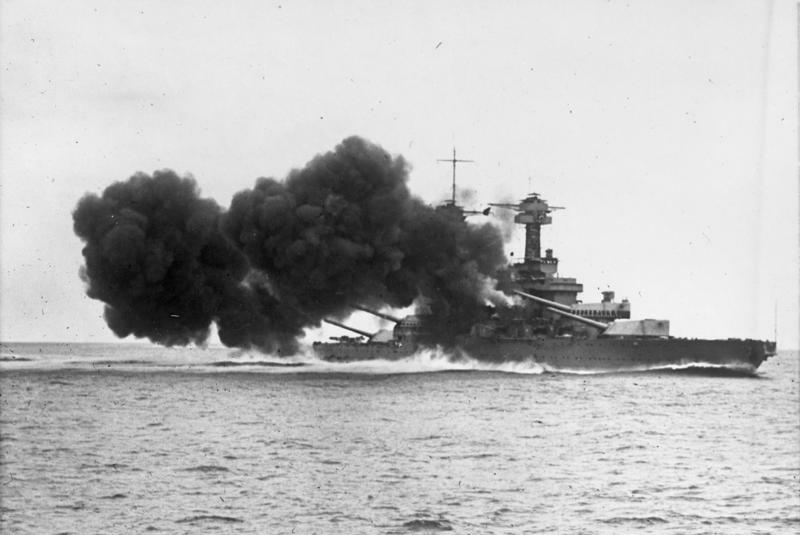
Firing a broadside

Fleet Problem XII took place from 15 to 21 February in the waters off the canal; the exercises consisted of an attack by a fleet reliant on aircraft carriers against the canal zone, which was defended by California and the battleships of the Battle Fleet. The maneuvers revealed critical limitations in the endurance and armament of the carrier aircraft of the day, and the battleships were easily able to defeat the carrier force. From 1 July to 16 August, California was stationed in Puget Sound, and later in August she steamed south to San Francisco and then to San Pedro. The ship took part in gunnery practice in early 1932 off San Nicolas Island. In March 1933, the frigate USS Constitution, then on a tour of the United States, arrived in California; a fleet of 130 ships, including California, welcomed the vessel on her arrival in Long Beach on 9 March. The next day, the 1933 Long Beach earthquake occurred, causing significant damage to the city and killing around 120 people. The fleet sent some 4,000 men ashore to assist in the relief effort, including crewmen from California.

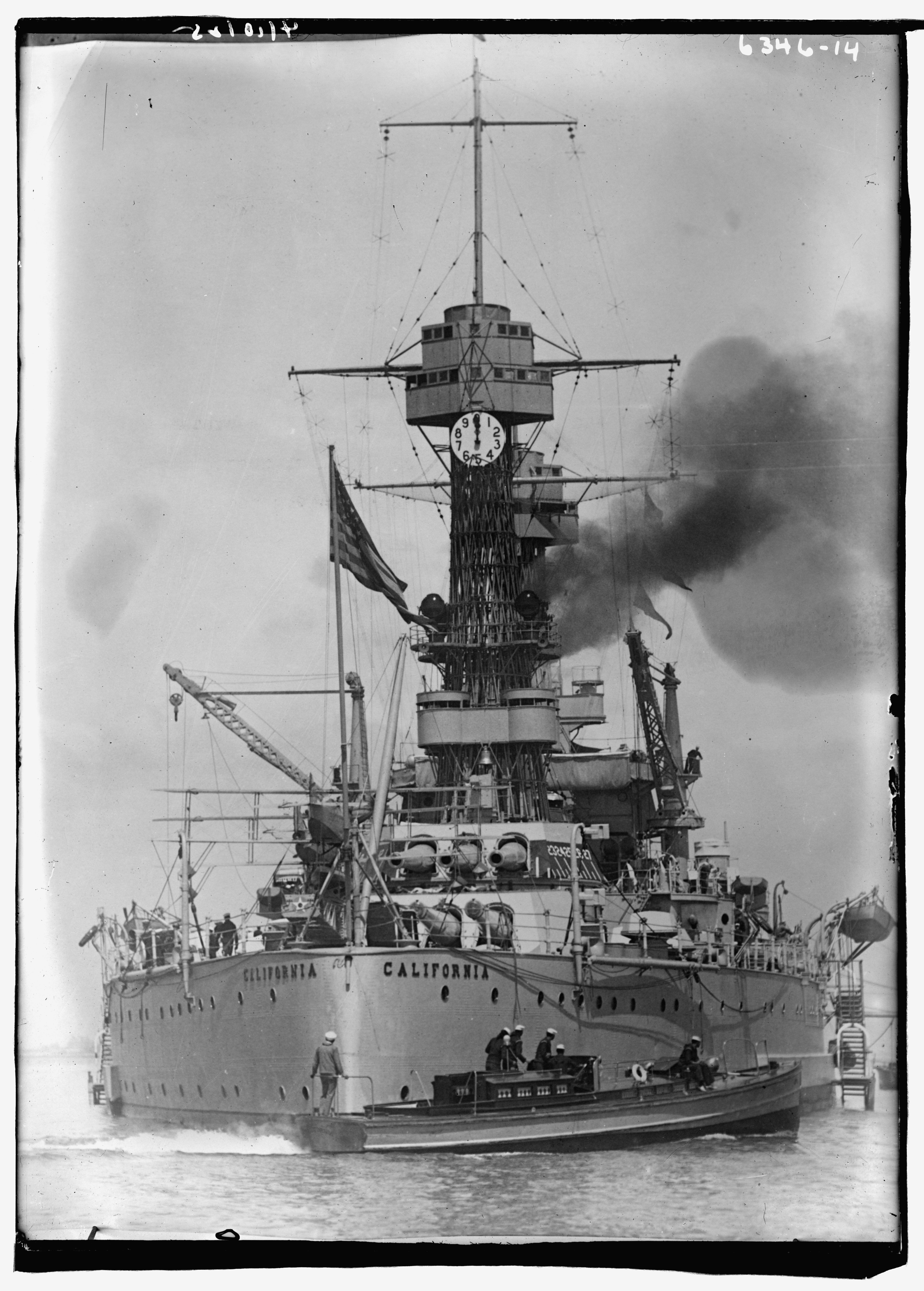
Stern view

In 1934, California was assigned to Battleship Division (BatDiv) 4, though she retained her role as fleet flagship. Following Fleet Problem XV, held from 19 April to 12 May in the Caribbean, the fleet visited Haiti for two weeks. On 25 May, the ships steamed north for another naval review off New York on 31 May, attended by President Franklin D. Roosevelt. On its return to the Pacific over the course of 27 October to 9 November, the Battle Fleet conducted exercises as it passed through the canal and steamed to San Pedro, including nighttime attacks by the accompanying destroyers. The maneuvers culminated in an attack by a force of simulated battleships—played by a group of light cruisers—the carrier Lexington, and several submarines. Thereafter, California and several other vessels participated in amphibious assault training on San Clemente Island on 15 November. For Fleet Problem XVI, held from 29 April to 10 June 1935, the fleet conducted a series of maneuvers in the eastern Pacific, ranging from Alaskan waters down to Midway Island and Hawaii.

In mid-1937, California transferred to BatDiv 2, and on 7 July the ships of the division visited Hawaii, returning to California on 22 August. California and her sister Tennessee transited the Panama Canal in early 1938 for a visit to Ponce, Puerto Rico, which lasted from 6 to 11 March. In 1939, the Navy decided to acquire six experimental XAF radar sets; on being delivered to the Navy, they were designated as CXAM radar; one set was installed aboard California in 1940, with the other five going to the carrier Yorktown and three heavy cruisers. In April and May, California participated in Fleet Problem XX, which was again held in the eastern Pacific. Following the conclusion of the maneuvers, Roosevelt ordered the Battle Fleet to remain in Hawaii permanently; the new forward deployment was calculated to deter Japanese aggression in the Pacific. As tensions rose owing to World War II in Europe and the Second Sino-Japanese War in Asia, the Navy cancelled Fleet Problem XXII, which had been scheduled for 1941. Early that year, the ship underwent an overhaul that concluded on 15 April, after which the ship made a visit to San Francisco.

=== World War II ===
==== Pearl Harbor attack ====
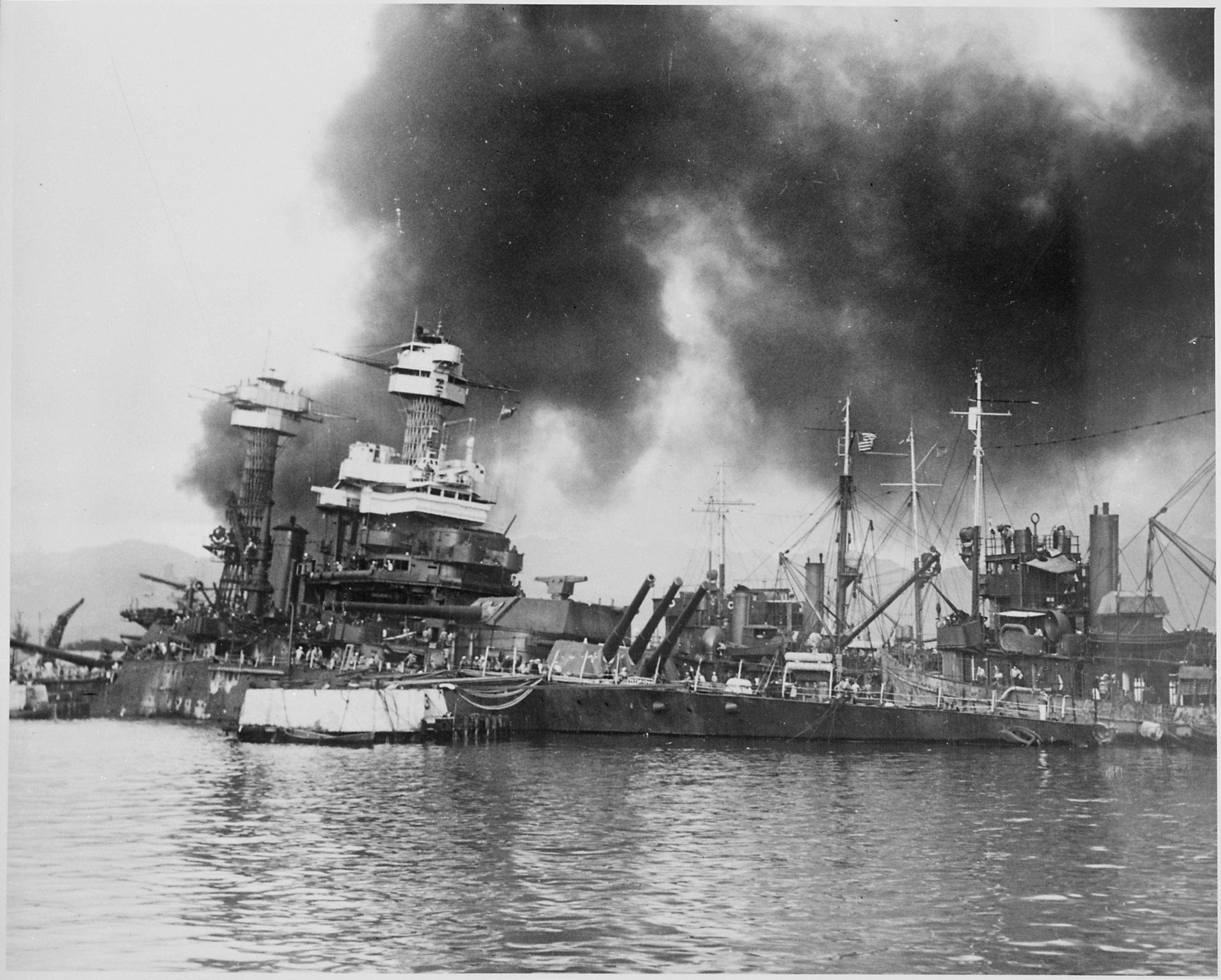
California sunk in shallow water at Pearl Harbor after the attack.

On the morning of 7 December 1941, California was moored on the southeastern side of Ford Island, the southernmost ship along Battleship Row. At the time, the ship had two of her 5-inch guns and two of her .50-cal. machine guns designated as ready guns, with fifty 5-inch shells and four hundred .50-cal. rounds at the guns. Immediately after the Japanese attack on Pearl Harbor began, California's first lieutenant, Lieutenant Commander Marion Little, who was the senior officer aboard the ship at the time, issued the order to general quarters. Little ordered the guns into action and prepared to get the ship underway. At 08:03, the crews of the ready guns began to engage the Japanese aircraft, which included Mitsubishi A6M Zero fighters that strafed the ship. The gunners quickly expended the ready ammunition, however, and the magazines had to be unlocked before they could be resupplied. While this effort was going on, a pair of Nakajima B5N torpedo bombers approached and dropped their torpedoes toward California. Both hit the ship at 08:05, one forward and the other further aft. The former detonated below the armor belt at frame 52 (between number 2 turret and the bridge), creating a hole 10 feet (3 m) high and 24 feet (7.3 m) long, destructively deforming the first torpedo bulkhead and transverse stiffeners between frames 47 and 60, and holing the second bulkhead with fragments. The latter tore a hole that was 40 feet (12 m) long below the belt armor. The interior torpedo bulkheads nevertheless held and helped to contain the flooding.

The ship had been prepared for inspection at the time of the attack, so the watertight doors had all been opened; the crew was still in the process of closing the doors when the torpedoes struck and flooding began. Many of the portholes and exterior doors were also open for the inspection, which allowed water to enter the ship, particularly as the ship took on water from the torpedo hits. As uncontrolled flooding started to spread throughout the ship, California began to list to port of 5 to 6 degrees. Little ordered damage control teams to counter-flood on the starboard side to keep the list to 4 degrees, but the flooding on the port side continued to spread. The torpedo blasts had also ruptured the forward fuel tanks, which allowed water to enter the fuel system. The contamination shut down the ship's electrical system, hindering the efforts of the damage control teams. Between 08:15 and 09:15, the ship was repeatedly attacked by Aichi D3A dive-bombers; one bomb hit on the starboard side and a near-miss on the port side caused minor damage. Anti-aircraft gunners aboard the ship claimed to have shot down two of the bombers, though credit for the downed aircraft is difficult to establish owing to the chaotic situation.

At 08:45, Commander Earl Stone, the ship's executive officer, boarded the ship and took command of the vessel. At the same time, California was struck by a bomb (which may have been one of the modified 16-inch (410 mm) armor-piercing shell) near the forwardmost casemate on the starboard side. After penetrating the upper deck, the bomb ricocheted off the second deck and detonated in the ship's interior, where it caused extensive damage, started a serious fire, and killed around 50 men. At around the same time, the boiler room crew got four of the boilers restarted, which restored power. By 09:15, the fire had spread to casemates No. 3, 5, and 7, by which time Captain Joel Bunkley and Vice Admiral William S. Pye, the Battle Fleet commander, had returned to the ship. Smoke from the fire eventually reached the forward engine room at 10:00 and forced the men inside to evacuate the area. This ended pumping efforts, though after the end of the attack other vessels came alongside to first battle the blaze and then to pump the water out. The portable pumps used by these vessels lacked the power necessary to counteract the flooding, and the ship eventually settled into the mud as the hull slowly filled with water over the next three days.

In the course of the attack, 104 men were killed, and 61 were wounded. Several men were awarded the Medal of Honor for their actions during the attack. Jackson C. Pharris, one of the ship's gunners, organized a group of men to carry ammunition up from the magazines and rescued several sailors who had been overcome by fuel oil fumes. Herbert C. Jones and Thomas Reeves both organized similar parties to carry ammunition, but both were killed during the attack. Robert R. Scott was also killed after he refused to leave his battle station. On 6 December 2019, the Department of Defense announced that twenty-five unknown remains from California had been exhumed for future identification.

==== Salvage, repair, and return to service ====
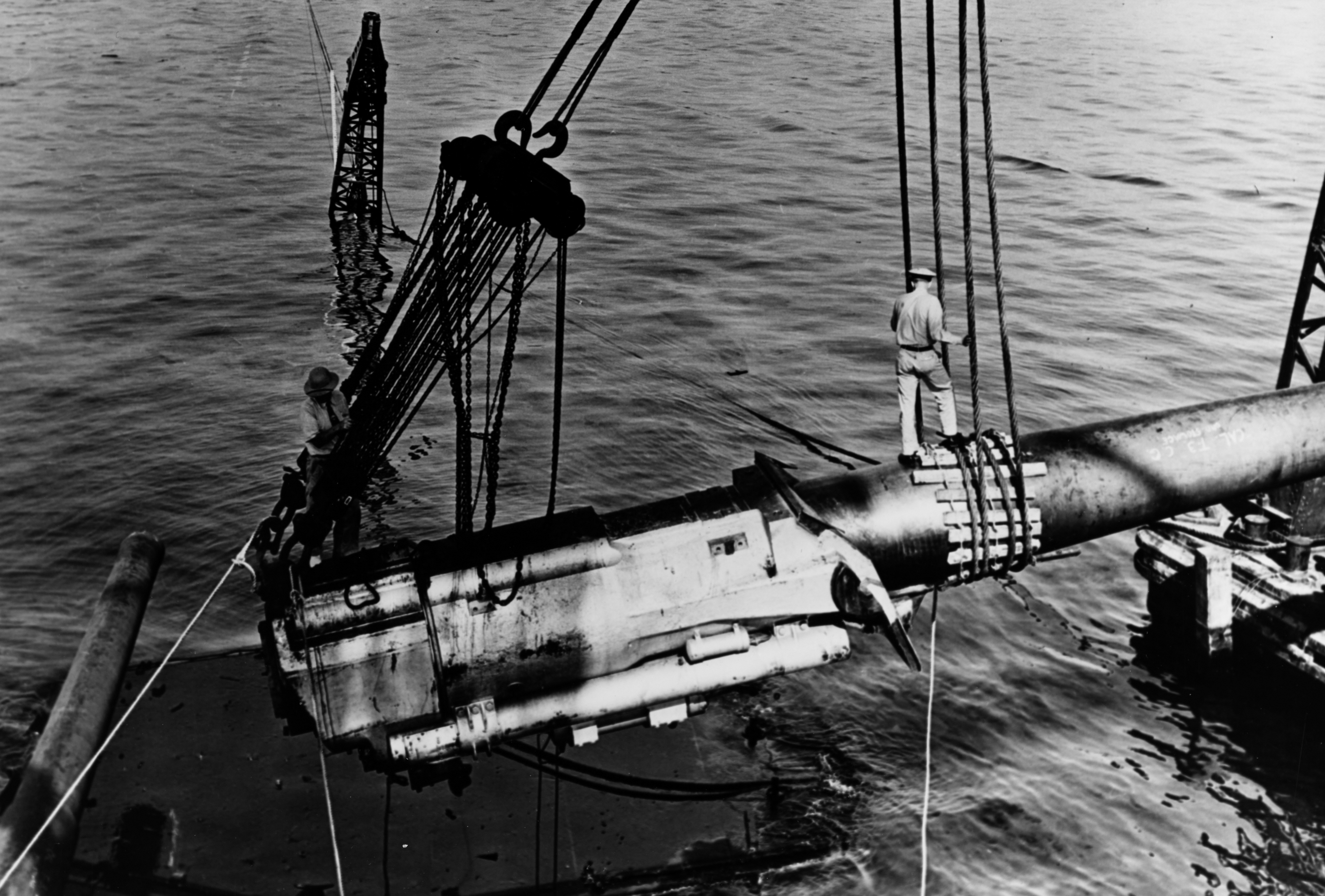
One of California's guns being raised from the ship to lighten her before being raised, c. February 1942

Over the next several months, salvage efforts proceeded as workers patched the hull and pumped out the water, finally refloating the ship on 25 March 1942. On 5 April, the ship suffered an accidental explosion at 13:15, most likely the result of a mixture of fuel oil vapor and hydrogen sulfide gas. The explosion dislodged the patch that had been used to cover the forward hole in the hull and damaged watertight doors, which caused serious flooding. Over the next few days, the salvage team had to re-patch the hull and pump it out again. On 9 April, California was able to enter Dry Dock No. 2 in Pearl Harbor; after completing initial repairs, she was refloated on 9 June and remained in port for several months.

On 10 October, California departed Pearl Harbor and met the destroyer Gansevoort at sea; the two vessels proceeded to Puget Sound, where California would undergo permanent repairs and a major modernization. This work lasted from 20 October 1942 to 31 January 1944. All of the ship's guns save her main battery were removed and her superstructure was razed completely in preparation for the reconstruction. Her hull was widened to improve the underwater protection scheme and increase stability. New fire control systems, which had been diverted from light cruisers that were converted into light aircraft carriers, were installed and her CXAM radar was removed and installed on Oahu. Her secondary battery was replaced with sixteen 5-inch/38 cal dual-purpose guns in new twin turrets and she received a large number of close-range anti-aircraft guns. In total, she was fitted with forty Bofors 40 mm (1.6 in) guns in ten quadruple mounts and forty-three 20 mm (0.79 in) Oerlikon guns.

Horizontal protection was considerably strengthened to improve her resistance to air attack; 3 inches of special treatment steel (STS) was added to the deck over the magazines and 2 inches (51 mm) of STS was added elsewhere. In place of her original conning tower, she received one of the towers that had been removed from the Brooklyn-class cruisers that had recently been rebuilt. California also had her old cage masts removed, with a modern tower mast installed in place of the forward cage mast. The changes doubled the ship's crew, to a total of 114 officers and 2,129 enlisted men. The ship was also reboilered, allowing her to maintain 20.5 knots despite the increase in displacement.

On 31 January 1944, California, Captain Henry Poynter Burnett, commanding, departed Puget Sound and began a series of sea trials followed by a shakedown cruise off San Pedro. The ship was then occupied with a variety of training to prepare the crew, many of whom were fresh from initial training, for combat operations in the Pacific. While in San Francisco, the ship underwent another machinery overhaul in April, and on 5 May the ship departed to join the fleet that was assembling in the central Pacific for the Marianas campaign. She proceeded first to the Hawaiian islands, where she took part in shore bombardment practice off Kahoolawe. She departed the area on 31 May, bound for the anchorage at Roi-Namur in the Marshall Islands. California arrived there on 8 June, where she joined Task Group (TG) 52.17, Fire Support Group 1, under the command of Rear Admiral Jesse B. Oldendorf.

==== Central Pacific campaigns ====
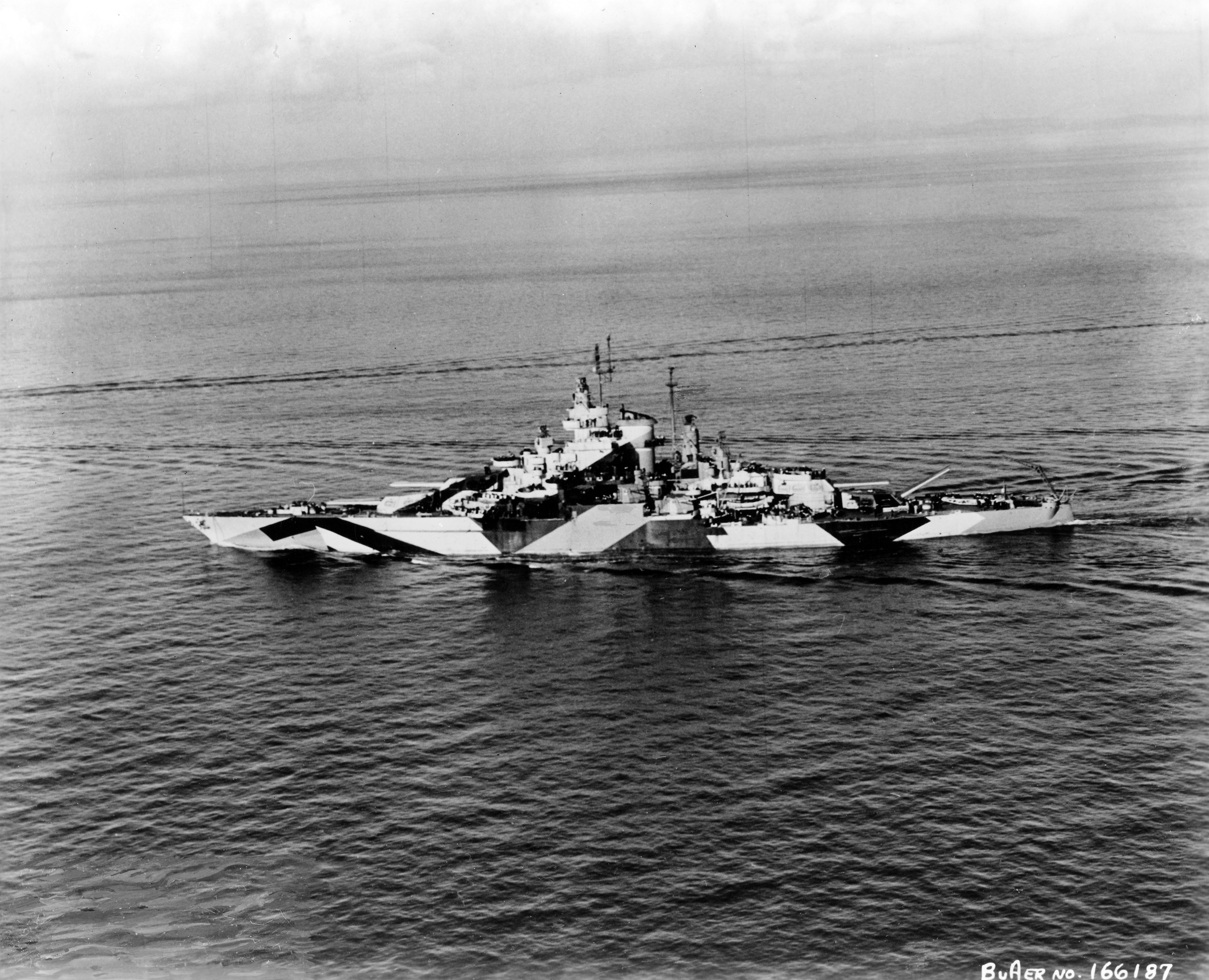
California after rebuilding

California and the rest of the fleet steamed to the Mariana Islands to begin the Mariana and Palau Islands campaign. The fleet arrived off the initial target, Saipan, late on 13 June. The next morning, California and the other ships of TG 52.17 moved into their bombardment positions, launched their spotting aircraft, and began shelling Japanese positions on the island. California opened fire at 05:58 at a range of 14,500 yards (13,300 m), engaging targets in the area around the capital, Garapan. A Japanese shell from a 4.7-inch (120 mm) field gun struck the ship at 09:10 aft of the fire control platform, killing one man and injuring ten. The ship's air search radar was disabled by the hit, which started a fire that was quickly contained by damage control teams. Later in the day, California left the area for the night, returning the next morning. At 09:54, American observers spotted a group of Japanese Type 95 and Type 97 tanks in Garapan, and California engaged them, destroying at least one of the tanks. The ship then helped to suppress a battery of Japanese guns on Mañagaha island that had been engaging the battleship Maryland. California bombarded Japanese positions throughout the day, withdrawing for the night at 18:30.

On the morning of 15 June, the American 2nd Marine Division went ashore and California supported the assault, opening fire at 06:12, first at Garapan and then at the landing beaches as dug-in defenders attempted to repel the landing. The ship also attacked Japanese artillery on Afetna Point, which had been shelling the marines. She remained off shore overnight, and after establishing radio communications with the marines ashore, provided fire support to break up Japanese night time counterattacks. California remained on station for several days, bombarding Japanese defenses as the marines pushed inland. On 17 June, she and Maryland shot down a Kawasaki Ki-61 fighter, and the next day California came under attack from another Ki-61 but was not damaged, apart from one of the 5-inch guns that was accidentally shot by one of the 40 mm guns. On 22 June, California withdrew to replenish ammunition and stores at Eniwetok in the Marshalls.

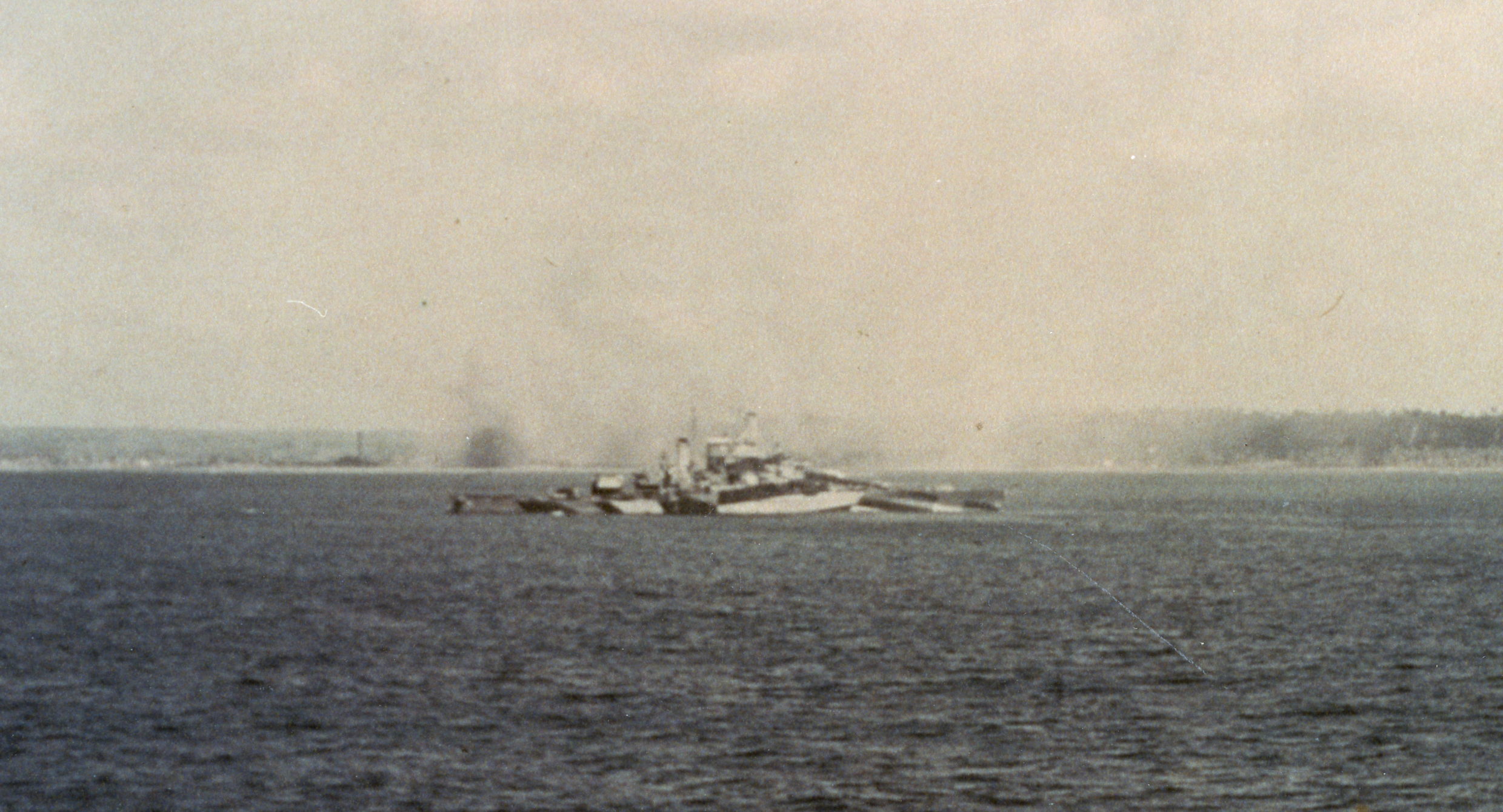
California off Guam in July 1944

After arriving in Eniwetok, she underwent repairs from 25 June to 16 July, thereafter returning to Saipan, which had by that time been secured. The next target, Guam, was to be attacked in Operation Stevedore. On arrival in the Marianas, California joined Tennessee and four destroyers to form Task Unit 53.1.16, which arrived off Guam on 19 July. The ships joined the preparatory bombardment that day as the ships sought to neutralize Japanese defenses around the invasion beaches. The shelling continued over the course of the next day before the landings on 21 July, with California concentrating her fire on the areas around Tumon and Agana. California provided initial support to the amphibious assault that began at 08:30, but left later that day at 15:00, bound for Saipan.

California replenished her ammunition at Saipan and then proceeded to Tinian, the next island to be attacked in the campaign. California and Tennessee arrived on 23 July and began a bombardment of San Jose on the southern end of the island as a diversion from the actual landing beaches on further north. The two battleships fired a total of 480 shells from their main guns and 800 rounds from their 5-inch guns, completely obliterating the town. At 17:00, the two ships checked their fire and withdrew for the night. The next morning, they returned to support the marines as they landed on the island. Fighting raged for the next several days, during which time California patrolled off the island, shelling Japanese forces. The ship's role in the battle culminated in a last stand by the Japanese defenders on 31 July, during which California and the other bombardment ships fired a terrific barrage against their positions. California then departed the area and returned to Guam to support the troops still fighting there until 9 August, when she left to replenish ammunition and fuel at Eniwetok.

On 19 August, California departed Eniwetok as part of a task force of battleships, cruisers, and destroyers bound for Espiritu Santo; while underway on 23 August, Tennessee suffered a steering malfunction that caused her to turn out of line and collide with California, tearing a hole in the latter's bow. Seven crewmen aboard California were killed in the accident, and several were trapped in their berthing compartment by bent bulkheads that had to be cut through to free them. Damage control teams shored up the damaged bulkheads and were able to pump the water out of the hull. Tennessee suffered more serious damage and she had to leave the group for repairs at Pearl Harbor; California continued with the convoy, and after arriving at their destination, entered the floating drydock Artisan for repairs that lasted from 25 August to 10 September. The collision prevented the ship from taking part in the Battle of Peleliu.

==== Philippines campaign ====
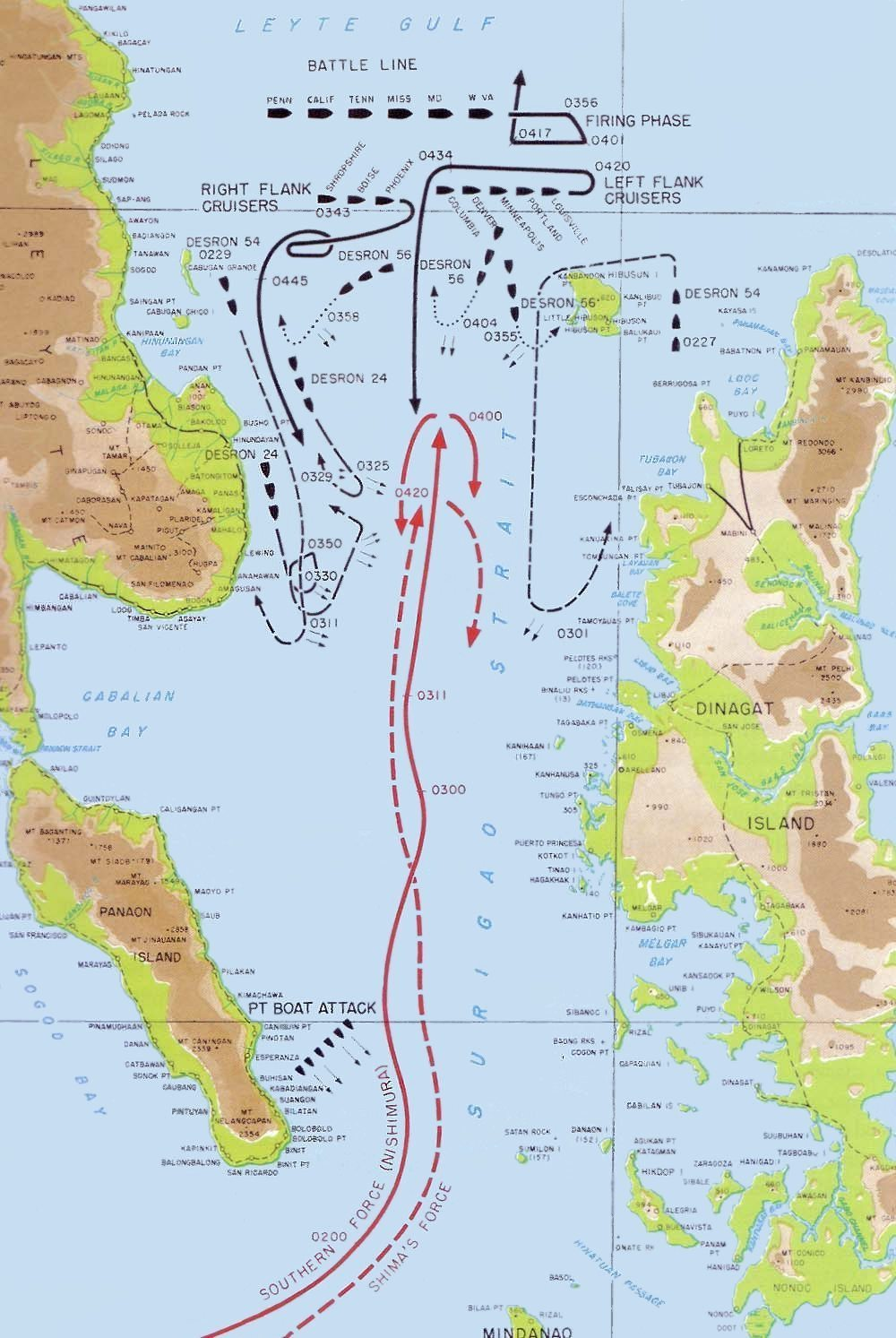
Map showing the movements of the American and Japanese fleets during the Battle of Surigao Strait

California left Espiritu Santo on 17 September and passed along the coast of New Guinea, where crewmen observed battles between Japanese and Australian forces during the New Guinea campaign. The ship arrived in Manus on 22 September, where preparations for the next operation began. California, again part of Oldendorf's bombardment group, which now included Maryland, Mississippi, Pennsylvania, Tennessee, and West Virginia, departed on 12 October bound for the Philippines. The Philippines campaign began five days later with initial landings by the 6th Ranger Battalion on the islands of Dinagat and Suluan. The latter attack made the Japanese aware of the impending assault on the Philippines, leading to the activation of Operation Shō-Gō 1, the planned riposte to an Allied landing. Allied minesweepers then began clearing channels into Leyte Gulf in preparation for the main landings at Leyte. On 19 October, the bombardment of the island began, continuing the next day as troops went ashore. A Zero fighter dove toward the ship later that day, one of the first kamikazes, but heavy anti-aircraft fire sent the plane off course and it crashed harmlessly off the starboard bow.

==== Battle of Leyte Gulf ====
Over the following days, California remained off the invasion beach, pounding Japanese positions as American forces pushed their way inland. During this period, the Japanese fleet began moving into position for their counterattack. Allied reconnaissance aircraft and submarines reported sightings of the fleet as it approached the area, prompting the bombardment group to withdraw to southern Leyte every night in anticipation of a Japanese attack on the amphibious assault ships. On 24 October, reports of Japanese naval forces approaching the area led Oldendorf's ships to prepare for action at the exit of the Surigao Strait. Vice Admiral Shōji Nishimura's Southern Force steamed through the Surigao Strait to attack the invasion fleet in Leyte Gulf; his force comprised Battleship Division 2—the battleships Yamashiro and Fusō, the heavy cruiser Mogami, and four destroyers—and Vice Admiral Kiyohide Shima's Second Striking Force—the heavy cruisers Nachi and Ashigara, the light cruiser Abukuma, and four more destroyers. As Nishimura's flotilla passed through the strait on the night of 24 October, they came under attack from American PT boats, followed by destroyers, initiating the Battle of Surigao Strait. One of these destroyers torpedoed Fusō and disabled her, though Nishimura continued on toward his objective.

At 03:12, California picked up the Japanese ships with her SG radar at a range of 42,200 yards (38,600 m); eight minutes later her forward Mk 8 fire control radar began tracking the ships, the range having fallen to 38,000 yards (35,000 m) by that time. West Virginia opened fire first at 03:52, followed by most of the other American battleships. California engaged the leading Japanese vessel at a range of 20,400 yards (18,700 m) with a six-gun salvo. After the initial phase of the battle, the American battle line turned about, but California misinterpreted the vague order to "turn one five" (meaning to turn 150 degrees—Captain Henry Burnett read it as an instruction to turn 15 degrees) and turned incorrectly, passing across Tennessee's bow. By now realizing his mistake, Burnett ordered California to turn hard to starboard while Tennessee hauled out of line. The two ships narrowly avoided each other but in the confusion, California masked Tennessee and blocked her from firing for several minutes, though California continued firing during this period. The ship suffered a misfire in the right gun of her rearmost turret, and concussion from the third salvo disabled the rear Mk 8 radar and damaged the scope for the forward radar, but the gunlayers nevertheless continued to accurately direct the guns. Sixteen minutes after opening fire, California checked her fire as the surviving Japanese ships turned and fled. By this time, several torpedoes launched by the Japanese vessels approached the American line, but none of them struck the battleships. In the course of the action, California fired a total of 63 shells from her main battery; the Japanese had lost both battleships, Abukuma, and four destroyers in the battle.

In the meantime, the main Japanese fleet, the Central Force under Vice Admiral Takeo Kurita, had passed through the San Bernardino Strait under cover of darkness and arrived early on 25 October. The Japanese battleships and cruisers attacked Taffy 3, a force of escort carriers and destroyers guarding the invasion fleet in the Battle off Samar, prompting its commander Rear Admiral Clifton Sprague to make urgent calls for help. Oldendorf immediately turned his ships northward to join the battle, and while en route the ships came under Japanese air attack. California's 5-inch and 40 mm guns attempted to engage the aircraft but did not score any hits. By the time the bombardment group arrived on the scene, Kurita had disengaged, having been convinced by Taffy 3's heavy resistance that he was instead facing the far more powerful Fast Carrier Task Force. With the battle over, the ships of the bombardment group resumed their ground support operations for the next month.

==== Battle of Lingayen Gulf ====
On 20 November, she departed for Manus for repairs that lasted from 25 November to 15 December. She then proceeded to the Kossol Roads in Palau, where she remained until 1 January 1945 when she got underway to return to Leyte Gulf. After rejoining the bombardment group, the fleet steamed to western Luzon to make the next major assault in Lingayen Gulf on the western side of the island. Japanese aircraft attacked the fleet while en route, though California was not damaged in the attacks. The fleet arrived off the gulf on 5 January and entered it the following morning. Early that morning California launched her floatplanes to spot for her guns before opening fire on Santiago Island on the western side of the gulf to silence any Japanese artillery that might threaten Allied forces once they entered Lingayen Gulf. The fleet's minesweepers then swept channels further into the gulf, which California helped to cover. With Oldendorf aboard, she led the bombardment group into the gulf to begin the bombardment to prepare for the invasion of Lingayen Gulf.

Shortly after 17:15 that day, a pair of Zero kamikazes approached the ship; California's gunners shot one of them down, but the other struck her on the port side abreast of the mainmast. Gasoline from the plane's fuel tanks started a fire and a 5-inch shell from another ship accidentally hit one of California's 5-inch guns, exploded inside the turret, and started another fire. Both fires were suppressed within twelve minutes, but the kamikaze inflicted significant casualties: 44 men were killed and another 155 were injured. Temporary repairs were made while the ship remained on station, continuing to bombard Japanese positions. Troops from the US Sixth Army went ashore on 9 January, and from 10 to 18 January, California left the gulf to patrol the South China Sea to guard against a possible attack by the Japanese fleet. She then returned to Lingayen Gulf but departed on 22 January for Ulithi, arriving there on 28 January.

California departed Ulithi and continued on to Pearl Harbor, where she stayed from 6 to 8 February, thereafter departing for Puget Sound for permanent repairs and modifications. On 24 April, California got underway for a brief set of trials before steaming south to Long Beach on 29 April. Further work was done there from 2 to 10 May, during which time she also underwent a shakedown cruise. On 10 May, she departed California to return to the fleet, then preparing for the attack on Okinawa. While en route, she stopped in Pearl Harbor from 16 to 29 May and in Ulithi from 9 to 12 June, after which she turned north to the Ryūkyū Islands.

==== Final operations ====
California anchored off Okinawa on 15 June, by which time the American forces had been fighting on the island for more than two months. The Japanese had launched a major kamikaze campaign during the operations on and around Okinawa, and these attacks continued while California was on station. On 17 and 18 June, she and the heavy cruisers New Orleans and Tuscaloosa bombarded Japanese positions on Yaesu-Dake and Yuza-Dake ridges in support of the 96th Infantry Division. Heavy fog hampered efforts by the ship's floatplanes to locate concealed Japanese positions, but California nevertheless conducted a heavy bombardment of the area over the two days. She thereafter patrolled off the island until 14 July to prevent any Japanese naval forces from attacking the invasion fleet. From 15 to 22 July, she lay at Kerama Rettō, replenishing fuel and stores, thereafter joining Task Force 95, which was sent into the East China Sea to clear mines. On 8 August, she was detached from TF 95 for maintenance at San Pedro Bay in the Philippines, the work lasting from 11 to 15 August.

While there, California's crew received word of the Japanese surrender. Once the work was completed, she steamed north to Nakagusuku Bay, Okinawa, where she remained from 23 August to 20 September, awaiting further orders. She then departed, bound for Wakayama, where she arrived on 23 September to support Sixth Army troops as they began the occupation of Japan. The following week, she proceeded further north to Yokosuka, arriving on 3 October and anchoring near the battleship Nagato. California thereafter joined Task Group 50.5, along with Tennessee and several other vessels for the return to the United States. They departed Japan on 15 October, bound for the Philadelphia Navy Yard. They sailed south to Singapore, stopping there on 23 October, where they met British, French, and Italian warships. The task group then proceeded through the Strait of Malacca into the Indian Ocean, stopping in Colombo from 30 October to 3 November. There, she embarked a contingent of South African troops bound for home.

The ships next stopped in Cape Town, South Africa, from 15 to 18 November, where the South African soldiers were disembarked. California and the other vessels then steamed into the Atlantic, stopping in Saint Helena and Ascension Island on the way to their destination. They reached Philadelphia on 7 December, where 754 officers and men were sent to discharge centers. Another 40 officers and 1,345 men were discharged over the following months as the crew prepared the ship to be laid up. She was formally placed in reserve, still in commission, on 7 August 1946. The ship was decommissioned on 14 February 1947 and remained in the Navy's inventory for another decade before being stricken from the Naval Vessel Register on 1 March 1959. She was thereafter sold to the Bethlehem Shipbuilding Corporation on 10 July and broken up. The 350-pound (160 kg) cast bronze bell was saved and put on display in Sacramento at the California State Capitol Park.
