= USS Pharris =

Knox-class frigate (1974–1992)

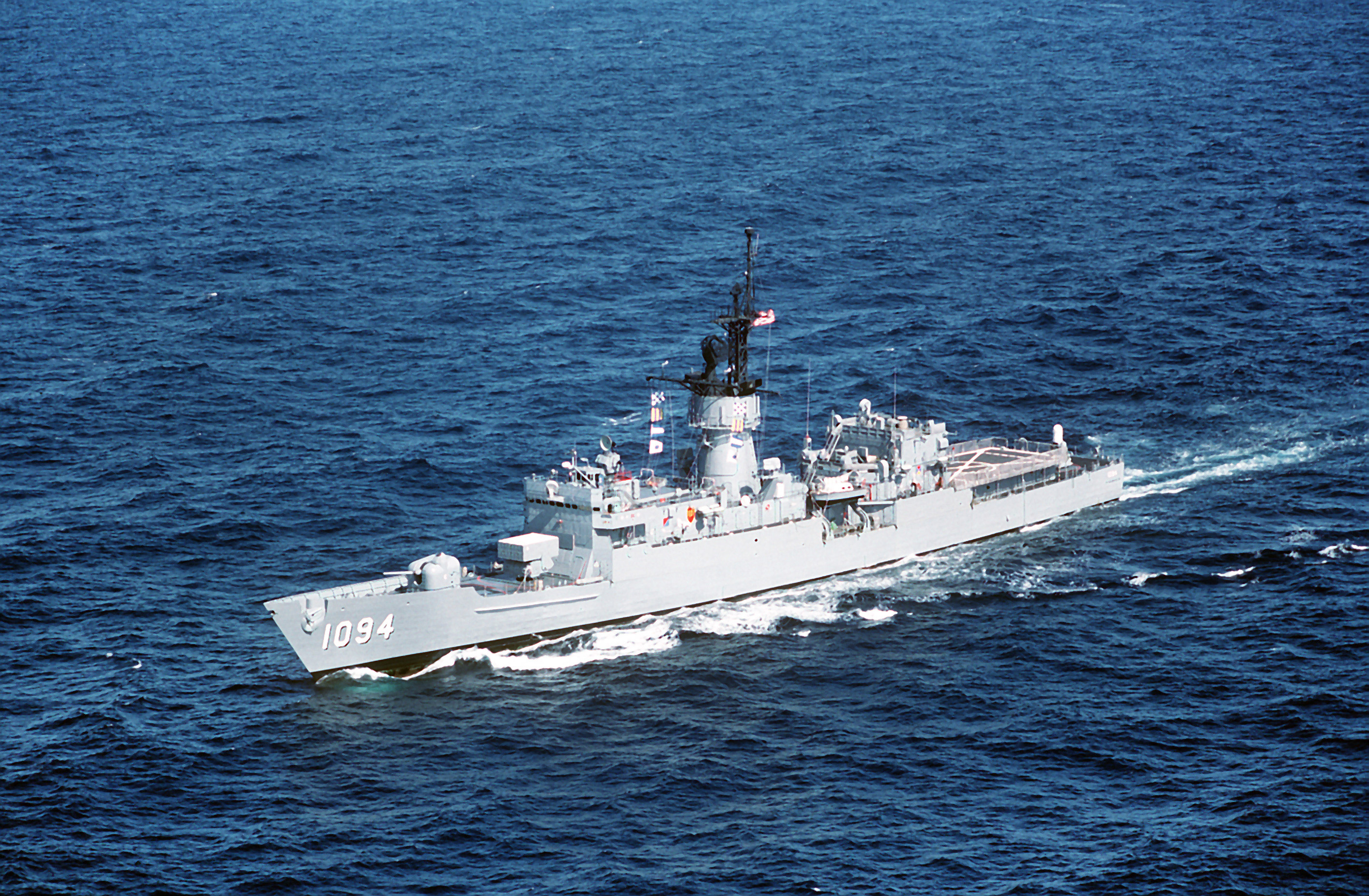
- USS Pharris (FF-1094), 1989

History

United States
- Namesake: Jackson C. Pharris
- Ordered: 25 August 1966
- Builder: Avondale Shipyard, Westwego, Louisiana
- Laid down: 11 February 1972
- Launched: 16 December 1972
- Acquired: 14 December 1973
- Commissioned: 26 January 1974
- Decommissioned: 15 April 1992
- Stricken: 11 January 1995
- Motto: Vigilance-Valor-Tenacity
- Fate: Donated to Mexico

Mexico
- Name: Victoria
- Namesake: Guadalupe Victoria
- Acquired: 2 February 2000
- Commissioned: 16 March 2000
- Decommissioned: c.2016
- Identification: Pennant number: F-213
- Fate: Awaiting disposal at Tuxpan

General characteristics
- Class & type: Knox-class frigate
- Displacement: 3,201 tons (4,182 tons full load)
- Length: 438 ft (134 m)
- Beam: 46 ft 9 in (14.25 m)
- Draught: 24 ft 9 in (7.54 m)
- Propulsion: 2 × CE 1,200 psi (8,300 kPa) boilers; 1 × Westinghouse geared turbine; 1 shaft, 35,000 shp (26,000 kW)
- Speed: >27 knots (50 km/h; 31 mph)
- Complement: 18 officers, 267 enlisted
- Sensors & processing systems: AN/SPS-40 Air Search Radar; AN/SPS-67 Surface Search Radar; AN/SQS-26 Sonar; AN/SQR-18 Towed array sonar system; Mk68 Gun Fire Control System
- Electronic warfare & decoys: AN/SLQ-32 Electronics Warfare System
- Armament: 1 × Mk-16 8 cell missile launcher for ASROC and Harpoon missiles; 1 × Mk-42 5-inch/54 caliber gun; Mark 46 torpedoes from four single tube launchers); 1 × 20mm Phalanx CIWS
- Aircraft carried: 1 × SH-2 Seasprite (LAMPS I) helicopter

USS Pharris (FF-1094) was a Knox-class frigate named after Medal of Honor recipient Lieutenant Commander Jackson C. Pharris. It was originally designated as destroyer escort DE-1094 and later reclassified as a frigate with the designation FF-1094 in the United States Navy. In 1992 the ship was decommissioned and transferred to the Mexican Navy. It was recommissioned as ARM Victoria, named after Mexico's first president, Guadalupe Victoria.

== US Navy career ==
Pharris was laid down 11 February 1972; launched 16 December 1972; and purchased 14 December 1973. She was commissioned 26 January 1974.

1975-1976, Pharris deployed to the Mediterranean Sea. From September 1976 to March 1977, Pharris deployed to the Indian Ocean and Persian Gulf. In 1978, the ship was part of NATO's Standing Naval Force Atlantic. The ship deployed to South America and western Africa and participated in UNITAS XXI from 28 June 1980 to 12 December 1980. In 1981, she deployed to the Persian Gulf. In 1983, she deployed to the Mediterranean Sea. In fall of 1985, Pharris deployed to the North Atlantic and participated in BALTOPS 85 and Ocean Safari.

In 1986 the Pharris while assigned to the USS America (CV-66) battle group assisted in Operation El Dorado Canyon which commenced early on the afternoon of 14 April 1986. At the conclusion of this operation the Pharris was awarded the Navy Expeditionary Medal and the Navy Unit Commendation.

During the 1987–1988 Mediterranean cruise, Pharris escorted Mighty Servant 2 carrying USS Samuel B. Roberts (FFG-58) from the entrance of the Persian Gulf to about halfway up the Red Sea. Pharris was awarded the Armed Forces Expeditionary Medal for its part in Operation Earnest Will.

Pharris participated in Fleet Week in New York on 4 May 1989. The ship was also at Navy Appreciation Week at Port Everglades on 6 October 1989.

In 1991, Pharris deployed again as a part of NATO's Standing Naval Force Atlantic. On 8 February 1991, during a port visit in the Madeira Islands, two Canadian divers from HMCS Margaree drowned when they were sucked into the cooling intake of Pharris while conducting a hull search.

Pharris was decommissioned 15 April 1992, and struck 11 January 1995. Ex-Pharris was disposed of through the Security Assistance Program, to Mexico, on 15 June 1999.

== Mexican Navy career ==
The ship was renamed ARM Victoria by the Mexican Navy and was commissioned 16 March 2000 as an Allende-class frigate. The ship was decommissioned in 2016. As of February 2024, it was awaiting disposal with her sister ships at Tuxpan.

== In fiction ==
In Tom Clancy's 1986 novel, Red Storm Rising, Pharris suffers extreme damage following a torpedo attack by a Victor III submarine (the bow forward of the ASROC mounts was torn off), warranting an extensive repair.

== Gallery ==
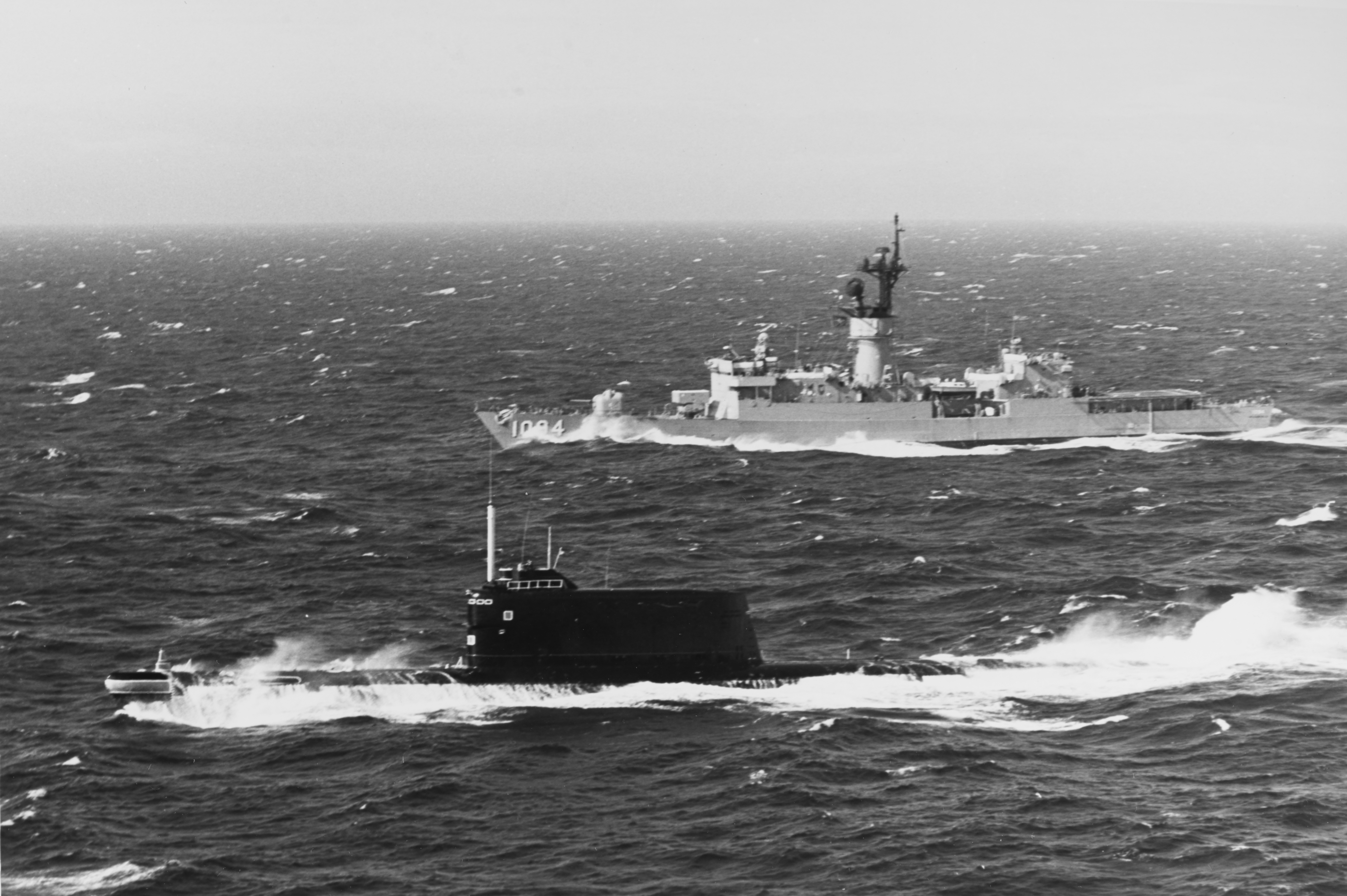
Pharris with a Soviet Golf II-class submarine, February 1978.

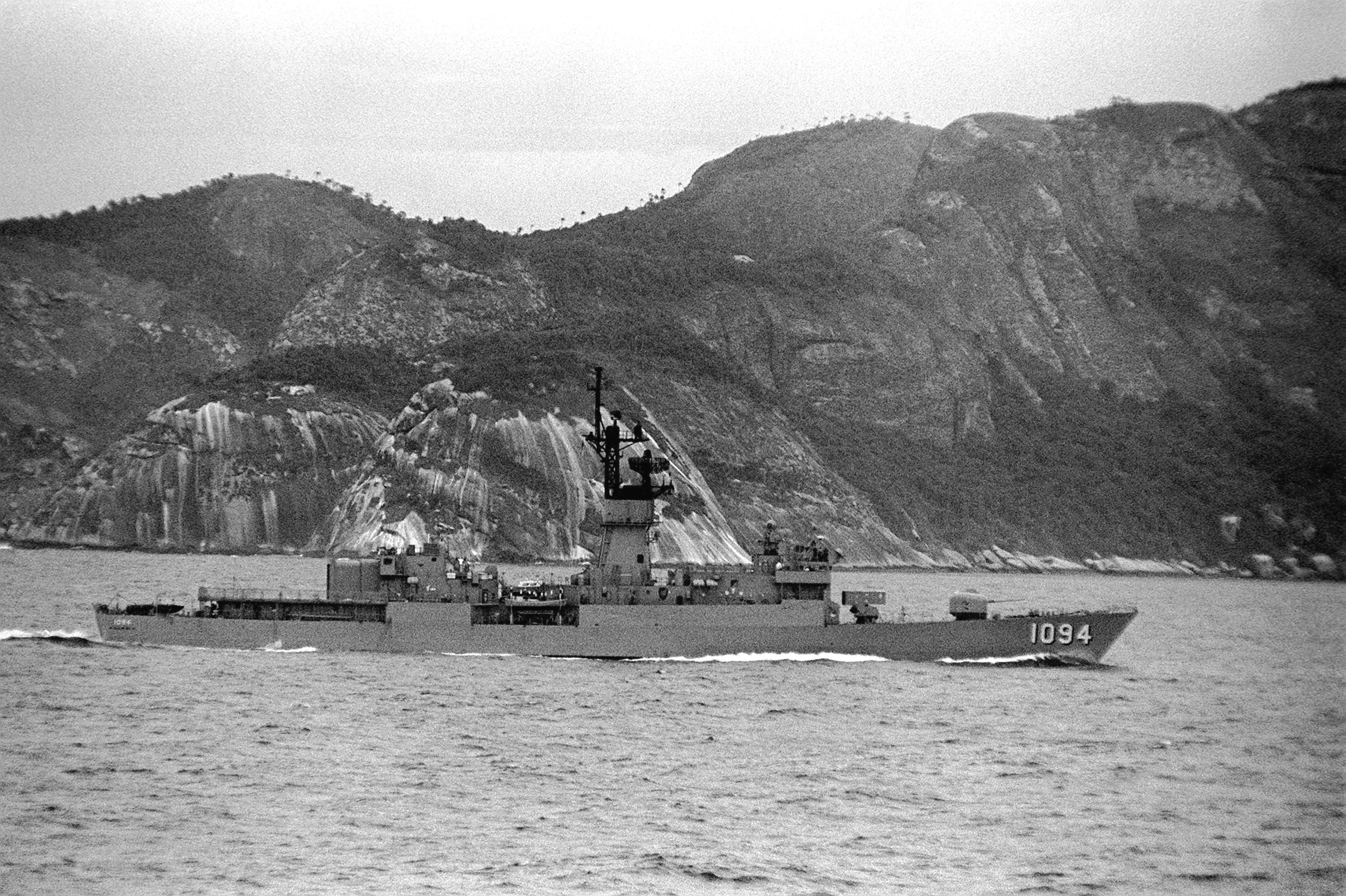
Pharris during UNITAS XXI, 1980.

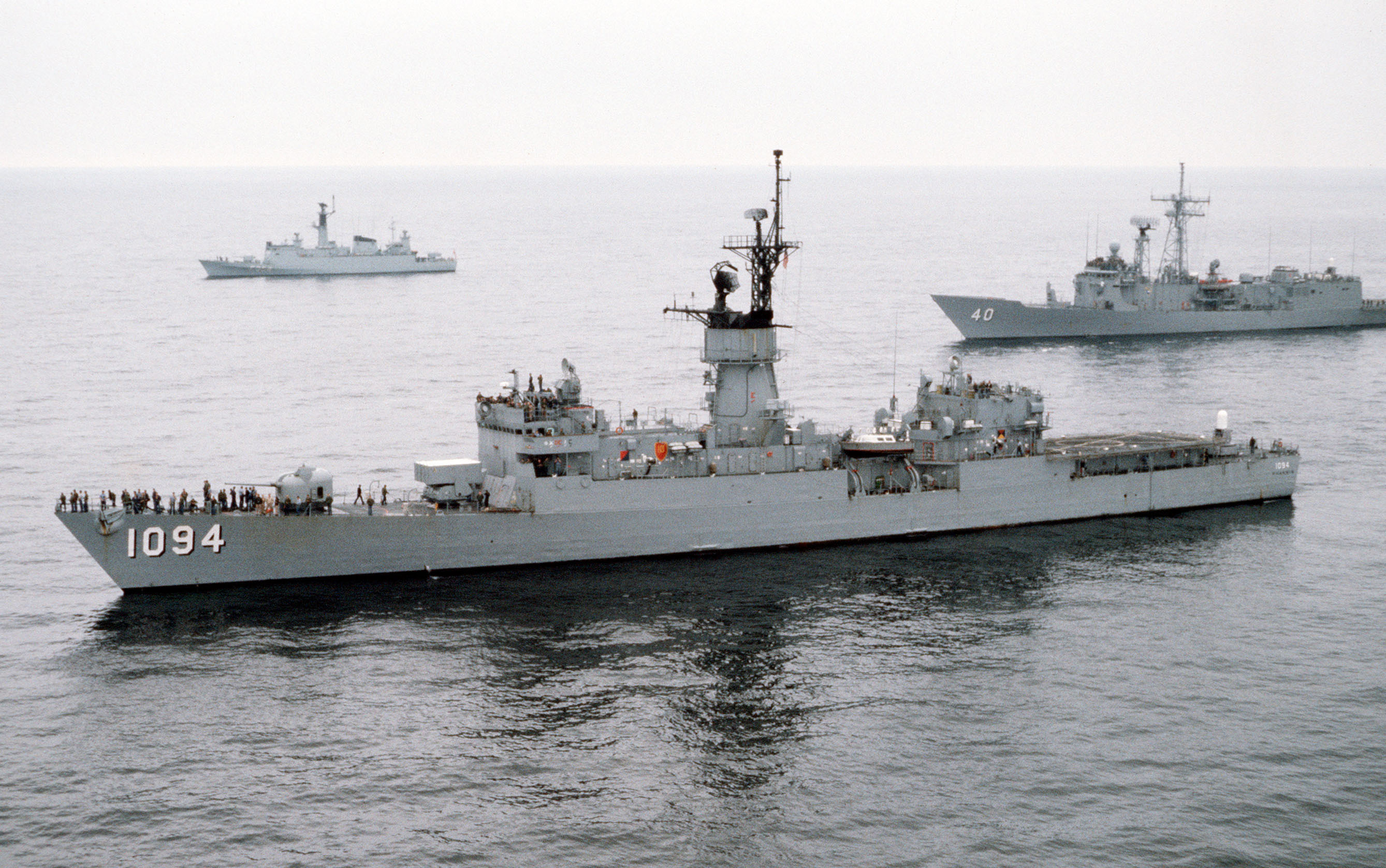
Pharris during BALTOPS '85.

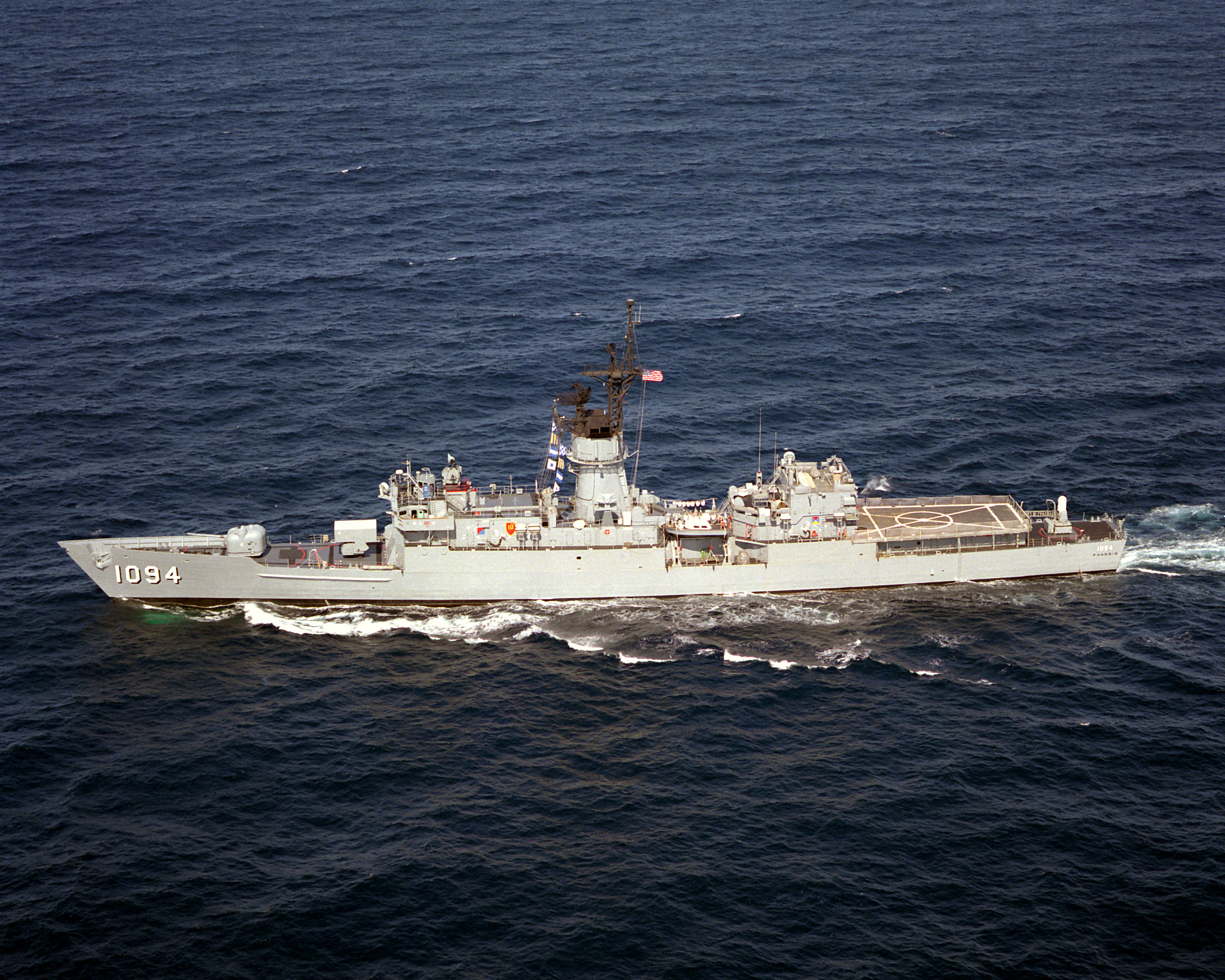
Pharris enroute to Fleet Week New York, 1989.
