= Jackson C. Pharris =

US Navy Medal of Honor recipient (1912–1966)

Jackson Charles Pharris
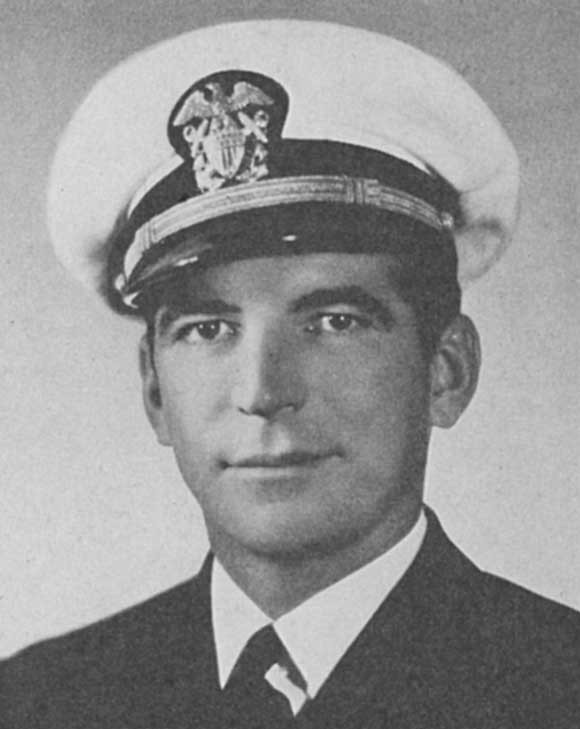
- Born: June 26, 1912; Columbus, Georgia, U.S.
- Died: October 17, 1966 (aged 54); Los Angeles, California, U.S.
- Burial place: Arlington National Cemetery
- Military career
- Allegiance: United States
- Branch: United States Navy
- Service years: 1933–1948
- Rank: Lieutenant Commander
- Units: USS California (BB-44); USS Saint Paul (CA-73)
- Conflicts: World War II: Attack on Pearl Harbor; Allied naval bombardments of Japan
- Awards: Medal of Honor; Purple Heart (2)

Jackson Charles Pharris (June 26, 1912 – October 17, 1966) was an officer in the United States Navy who received the Medal of Honor for heroism during the attack on Pearl Harbor.

== Early life ==
Jackson C. Pharris grew up in Columbus, Georgia, the oldest of five children. He joined the United States Navy on April 25, 1933. In September 1933, he reported aboard the USS California (BB-44) as a gunner. He was assigned to the USS Mississippi until December 1940. Pharris reported aboard the USS California in January 1941. The ship reached Pearl Harbor on November 8, 1941.

== World War II ==
For his actions on board the USS California during the Japanese attack on Pearl Harbor, he was awarded the Navy Cross, which was later upgraded to the Medal of Honor.

Due to the injuries he received, Pharris was hospitalized at Naval Hospital, Pearl Harbor until March 1942. After being released from the hospital, he returned to the USS California. On July 17, 1942, Pharris earned his commission. In January 1943, he was admitted again to the US Naval Hospital after collapsing because of a lack of oxygen due to oil still in his lungs. He returned to duty in June.

In October 1944, Pharris moved to Boston, Massachusetts, where he reported aboard the USS Saint Paul (CA-73), a newly commissioned heavy cruiser. The ship left for Japan to participate in bombardments of the Japanese mainland. In September 1945, just five days after the surrender proclamation, Lieutenant Pharris was on deck when a Japanese kamikaze dove at the ship. He ordered the crew to take cover and he directed the firing of the guns and shot it down. His back was broken from the impact of the guns.

Pharris was transported to US Naval Hospital Oakland, California. In October 1945, he was transferred to the US Naval Hospital in Long Beach, California. After discharge from the hospital in April 1946, he was temporarily assigned to Naval Weapons Station Seal Beach, Terminal Island, Long Beach Naval Shipyard, and Port Hueneme. He was medically retired in May 1948 as a lieutenant commander. His Medal of Honor was presented by President Harry S. Truman on June 25, 1948.

== Personal life ==
In November 1942, Pharris met Elizabeth Potter at a social in the USS California's Officers' Mess while the ship was in Bremerton, Washington. While attending school in Washington, D.C., he proposed, and they were married on August 24, 1943. Following his Navy retirement, the Pharris family settled in Rolling Hills Estates in Los Angeles County. Pharris attended Long Beach City College and the University of Southern California. On June 9, 1956, he graduated from the latter with a Bachelor of Science in Commerce.

On October 16, 1966, while attending a Congressional Medal of Honor activity, Pharris collapsed and was taken to the Veterans Administration Hospital in Los Angeles, where he died the next day of a heart attack. He was buried at Arlington National Cemetery. His wife, Elizabeth L. Pharris, died on February 14, 2002, and is also buried in Arlington National Cemetery.

== Medal of Honor citation ==
Medal of Honor citation:
For conspicuous gallantry and intrepidity at the risk of his life above and beyond the call of duty while attached to the U.S.S. California during the surprise enemy Japanese aerial attack on Pearl Harbor, Territory of Hawaii, December 7, 1941. In charge of the ordnance repair party on the third deck when the first Japanese torpedo struck almost directly under his station, Lt. (then Gunner) Pharris was stunned and severely injured by the concussion which hurled him to the overhead and back to the deck. Quickly recovering, he acted on his own initiative to set up a hand-supply ammunition train for the antiaircraft guns. With water and oil rushing in where the port bulkhead had been torn up from the deck, with many of the remaining crewmembers overcome by oil fumes, and the ship without power and listing heavily to port as a result of a second torpedo hit, Lt. Pharris ordered the shipfitters to counterflood. Twice rendered unconscious by the nauseous fumes and handicapped by his painful injuries, he persisted in his desperate efforts to speed up the supply of ammunition and at the same time repeatedly risked his life to enter flooding compartments and drag to safety unconscious shipmates who were gradually being submerged in oil. By his inspiring leadership, his valiant efforts and his extreme loyalty to his ship and her crew, he saved many of his shipmates from death and was largely responsible for keeping the California in action during the attack. His heroic conduct throughout this first eventful engagement of World War II reflects the highest credit upon Lt. Pharris and enhances the finest traditions of the U.S. Naval Service.

== Awards and decorations ==

1st row	Medal of Honor Upgraded from Navy Cross in 1948		Purple Heart with 5/16 inch star
2nd row	Combat Action Ribbon Retroactively Awarded, 1999	Navy Good Conduct Medal with 2 Service stars	American Defense Service Medal with 'Fleet' Clasp
3rd row	American Campaign Medal	Asiatic-Pacific Campaign Medal with 2 Campaign stars	World War II Victory Medal

== Namesake ==
In 1972, the destroyer escort USS Pharris (DE-1094) was named in his honor.

== See also ==
- List of Medal of Honor recipients
