= Reeves (surname) =

Reeves is a surname. Notable people with the surname include:

- A. J. Reeves (born 1999), American basketball player
- Al Reeves (1864–1940), American vaudeville entertainer
- Alan Reeves (footballer), English former football player
- Alec Reeves (1902–1971), English electronics engineer
- Amber Reeves, feminist writer
- Ana Reeves, Chilean television, film and theatre actress
- Anita Reeves (died 2016), Irish film and stage actress
- Antonio Reeves (born 2000), American basketball player
- Bass Reeves, famous lawman from the late 1800s
- Brian Reeves, Mechanic (died 2023-2024)
- Billy Reeves (footballer)
- Bryant Reeves, American basketball player
- Carlton W. Reeves, American judge
- Charles Stephen Reeves (1836–1912), New Zealand businessman and Mayor of Dunedin
- Charles Reeves (architect) (1815–1866), British architect
- Conner Reeves, British singer-songwriter
- Christopher B. Reeves, Emmy-winning sound editor
- Connie Douglas Reeves, cowgirl
- Dan Reeves (1944–2022), American football player and coach
- Del Reeves (1932–2007), American country music singer
- Dennis Reeves, Scottish former football player
- Dianne Reeves, American jazz singer
- Edith Reeves, American silent film actress
- Edward Ayearst Reeves (1862–1945), British geographer
- George Reeves, American actor
- George R. Reeves, Texas legislator after whom Reeves County, Texas is named
- Harry Reeves (disambiguation)
- Hubert Reeves, Canadian astrophysicist and science writer
- James Reeves (disambiguation)
- Jim Reeves (1923–1964), American country music singer and songwriter
- John Reeves (disambiguation)
- Joseph M. Reeves, American admiral
- Julianne Michelle Reeves (born 1984), American actress
- Keanu Reeves, American-Canadian actor
- Kenneth Reeves, mayor of Cambridge, Massachusetts
- Lois Reeves, singer, sister of Martha Reeves
- Martha Reeves (born 1941), American R&B singer
- Matt Reeves (born 1966), American film writer, director and producer
- Maud Pember Reeves, feminist and socialist
- Melissa Reeves, American actress
- Michael Reeves, American internet personality
- Mike Reeves (footballer), English football player
- Mike Reeves (baseball), Canadian baseball player
- Milton Reeves, creator of the OctoAuto
- Olivia Reeves (born 2003), American weightlifter
- Orlando Reeves, the mythological namesake of Orlando, Florida
- Pamela L. Reeves, American judge
- Paul Reeves, former archbishop and Primate of New Zealand
- Peggy Reeves (born 1952), American politician
- Perrey Reeves, American actress
- Rachel Reeves, British politician
- Richard Reeves (disambiguation)
- Ron Reeves, Australian rules footballer
- Ron Reeves (gridiron football), American football player
- Ryan Reeves (born 1981), American professional wrestler better known as Ryback
- Samantha Reeves, American tennis player
- Saskia Reeves, British actress
- Siân Reeves, British actress
- Steve Reeves, American bodybuilder, actor and author
- Steve Reeves (computer scientist), New Zealand computer scientist
- Stevie Reeves, auto racing driver
- Thomas James Reeves, American Medal of Honor recipient
- Tim Reeves, Australian historian, author of works about the murder of George Duncan
- Tim Reeves (born 1972), English sidecar racer
- Triette Reeves, American politician
- Vic Reeves, pseudonym for comedian James Roderick "Jim" Moir
- William Reeves (disambiguation)

== Fictional characters ==
- Tad Reeves, fictional character
- Judy Reeves, fictional character

== See also ==
- Reeve (surname)
- Reaves, surname
- Steve Reevis (1962–2017), Native American actor
