= Anthony Wood (antiquary) =

English antiquarian (1632–1695)

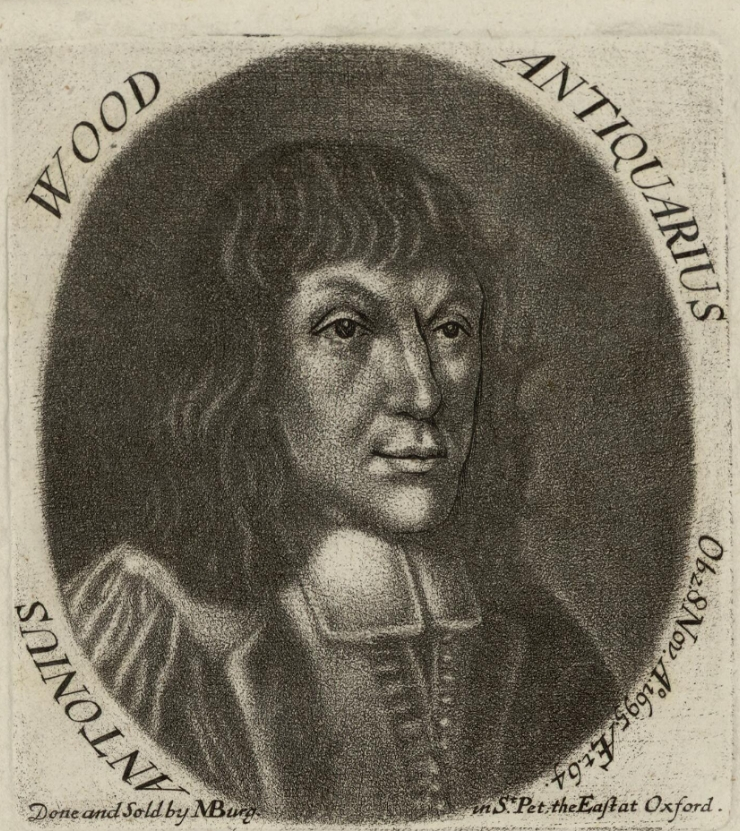
- Portrait of Wood by Michael Burghers
- Born: 17 December 1632; Oxford, England
- Died: 28 November 1695 (aged 62); Oxford, England
- Resting place: Merton College, Oxford
- Other name: Anthony à Wood
- Education: New College School, Oxford; Lord Williams's School, Thame; Merton College, Oxford
- Occupation: Antiquary
- Employer: University of Oxford
- Awards: MA (Oxford, 1655)

Anthony Wood (17 December 1632 – 28 November 1695), who styled himself Anthony à Wood in his later writings, was an English antiquary. He was responsible for a celebrated Hist. and Antiq. of the Universitie of Oxon.

He meticulously researched and documented the history of Oxford, producing significant works such as the Historia et Antiquitates Universitatis Oxoniensis and the Athenae Oxonienses. Despite criticism for errors and suspected biases, his works remain invaluable. Wood had free access to university records, consulted with notable scholars, and faced controversy, including banishment from the University of Oxford. Unmarried, he led a life devoted to scholarship and antiquarian pursuits.

== Early life ==
Anthony Wood was born in Oxford on 17 December 1632, as the fourth son of Thomas Wood (1581–1643), BCL of Oxford, and his second wife, Mary (1602–1667), daughter of Robert Pettie and Penelope Taverner. His father, who was born in Islington and attended Broadgates Hall, Oxford, was 'fairly wealthy', having married well and invested in property in Oxford. His mother was a granddaughter of Richard Taverner (died 1575) of Woodeaton, Clerk of the Signet to Edward VI, and Mary Harcourt, one of the eight daughters of Sir John Harcourt (died 19 February 1566) of Stanton Harcourt.

Wood was sent to New College School in 1641, and at the age of twelve was removed to the free Lord Williams's School at Thame, where his studies were interrupted by Civil War skirmishes. He was then placed under the tuition of his brother Edward (1627–1655), of Trinity College, Oxford, and, as he tells us, "while he continued in this condition his mother would alwaies be soliciting him to be an apprentice which he could never endure to heare of". He was entered at Merton College in 1647, and made postmaster, a type of scholar at Merton.

In 1652, Wood amused himself with ploughing and bell-ringing. "Having had from his most tender years an extraordinary ravishing delight in music", he began to teach himself the violin and took his BA examinations. He engaged a music-master and obtained permission to use the Bodleian Library, "which he took to be the happiness of his life". He received the MA degree in 1655, and in the following year published a volume of sermons by his late brother Edward.

== Career as an antiquary ==
Wood began, systematically, to copy monumental inscriptions and to search for antiquities in the city and neighbourhood. He went through the Christ Church, Oxford registers, "at this time being resolved to set himself to the study of antiquities." John Wallis, the keeper, allowed him free access to the university registers in 1660; "here he layd the foundation of that book which was fourteen years afterwards published, viz. Hist. et Antiq. Univ. Oxon". He also came to know the Oxford collections of Brian Twyne to which he was greatly indebted, and those of the assiduous antiquary Ralph Sheldon.

He steadily investigated the muniments of all the colleges, and in 1667 made his first journey to London, where he visited William Dugdale, who introduced him into the Cottonian Library, and William Prynne showed him the same civility for the Tower records.

On 22 October 1669, he was sent for by the delegates of the press, "that whereas he had taken a great deal of paines in writing the Hist. and Antiq. of the Universitie of Oxon, they would for his paines give him an 100 li. for his copie, conditionally, that he would suffer the book to be translated into Latine". He accepted the offer and set to work to prepare his English manuscript for the translators, Richard Peers and Richard Reeve, both appointed by John Fell, Dean of Christ Church, who undertook the expense of printing. In 1674, appeared Historia, et antiquitates Universitatis Oxoniensis, handsomely reprinted "e Theatro Sheldoniano" in two folio volumes, the first devoted to the university in general and the second to the colleges.

Copies were widely distributed, and university and author received much praise; in the following year the magnificent series of illustrations linked to the history were separately published as David Loggan's Oxonia Illustrata, which contained instructions on where to insert the plates in Wood's history; copies of the history 'with the cuts' became a special gift object for noble visitors to the university.

Wood was disappointed with the Latin translation, and Bishop Barlow told a correspondent that "not only the Latine but the history itself is in many things ridiculously false".

Despite the carping, Wood's meticulously researched text, with extensive footnotes to original sources, remains a worthy successor to Dugdale's work which had been his inspiration.

In 1678 the university registers which had been in Wood's custody for eighteen years were removed, as it was feared that he would be implicated in the Popish Plot. To relieve himself from suspicion he took the Oath of Supremacy. During this time he had been gradually completing his great work, which was produced by a London publisher in 1691–1692, 2 vols. folio, Athenae Oxonienses: an Exact History of all the Writers and Bishops who have had their Education in the University of Oxford from 1500 to 1690, to which are added the Fasti, or Annals for the said time. Wood contemplated publishing a third volume of the Athenae, printed in the Netherlands. The third appeared subsequently as "a new edition, with additions, and a continuation by Philip Bliss" (1813–1820, 4 vols. 4to). The Ecclesiastical History Society proposed to bring out a fourth edition, which stopped at the Life, ed. by Bliss (1848, 8vo; see Cent. Mag., N.S., xxix. 135, 268). Bliss's interleaved copy is in the Bodleian.

On 29 July 1693, Wood was condemned and fined in the vice-chancellor's court for certain libels against the late Edward Hyde, 1st Earl of Clarendon. He was punished by being banished from the university until he recanted, the offending pages being burnt. The proceedings were printed in a volume of Miscellanies, published by Edmund Curll in 1714. Wood was attacked by Bishop Burnet in A letter to the Bishop of Lichfield and Coventry (1693), and defended by his nephew Thomas Wood, in a Vindication of the Historiographer, to which is added the Historiographer's Answer (1693), reproduced in the subsequent editions of the Athenae. The nephew also defended his uncle in An Appendix to the Life of Bishop Seth Ward (1697). After a short illness Anthony Wood died, and was buried in the outer chapel of St John Baptist (Merton College), in Oxford, where he had superintended the digging of his own grave only a few days before.

He was described as "a very strong lusty man," of uncouth manners and appearance, not so deaf as he pretended, of reserved and temperate habits, not avaricious and a despiser of honours. He received neither office nor reward from the university which owed so much to his labours. He never married, and led a life of self-denial, entirely devoted to antiquarian research. Bell-ringing and music were his chief relaxations. His literary style is poor, and his taste and judgment are frequently warped by prejudice, but his two great works and unpublished collections form a priceless source of information on Oxford and her worthies. He was always suspected of being a Roman Catholic, and invariably treated Jacobites and Papists better than Dissenters in the Athenae, but he died in communion with the Church of England. (Note: Tedder (1911) states that the most minute particulars of Wood's life can be obtained from his Diaries (1657–1695) and autobiography; all earlier editions were superseded by the elaborate work of Andrew Clark, The Life and Times of Anthony Wood, Antiquary, of Oxford, 1632–1695, described by himself (Oxford Historical Society, 1891–1900, 5 vols. 8vo).)

== Legacy ==
Wood's original manuscript (purchased by the Bodleian in 1846) was first published by John Gutch as The History and Antiquities of the Colleges and Halls in the University of Oxford, with a continuation (1786–1790, 2 vols. 4to), and The History and Antiquities of the University of Oxford (1792–1796, 3 vols. 410), with a portrait of Wood. To these can be added The Antient and Present State of the City of Oxford, chiefly collected by A. à Wood, with additions by the Rev. Sir J. Peshall (1773, 4to; the text is garbled and the editing very imperfect). The Survey of the Antiquities of the City of Oxford, composed in 1661–66 by Anthony Wood, edited by Andrew Clark, was issued by the Oxford Historical Society (1889–1899, 3 vols. 8vo). Modius Salium, a Collection of Pieces of Humour was published at Oxford in 1751, 12mo. Some letters between John Aubrey and Wood were published in the Gentleman's Magazine (3rd ser., ix. x. xi.).

Wood bequeathed his library (127 manuscripts and 970 printed books) to the Ashmolean Museum, and the keeper, William Huddesford, printed a catalogue of the manuscripts in 1761. In 1858 the whole collection was transferred to the Bodleian Library, where 25 volumes of Wood's manuscripts had been since 1690. Many of the original papers from which the Athenae was written, as well as several large volumes of Wood's correspondence and all his diaries, are preserved in the Bodleian.

== In fiction ==
A fictionalised version of Anthony Wood is one of four narrators in Iain Pears' 1998 novel An Instance of the Fingerpost, which is set in the early 1660s.

== Works ==
Wood regularly wrote in his diaries and in other writings. With this, he wrote several accounts of life in Oxford in the mid-17th century. Below are his works:

- History of Oxford down to 1640 (–1674)
- Athenae Oxoniensis (1680–)
