= Reavis =

Reavis may refer to:

== People with the surname ==
- C. Frank Reavis (1870–1932), American politician from Nebraska
- C. J. Reavis (born 1995), American football player
- Charles G. Reavis (1892–1984), American politician from North Carolina
- Dave Reavis (born 1950), American football player
- Hattie King Reavis, American singer, song writer, and theater performer
- Isham Reavis (1836–1914), American jurist
- James Reavis (1843–1914), the Baron of Arizona, a 19th-century forger and fraudster
- James Bradley Reavis (1848–1912), justice of the Washington Supreme Court
- Joseph C. Reavis (1899–1957), American politician from Nebraska
- Perri Stauffer Reavis, former radio presenter for KLTY, actress most recently co-star in Reflect and The Sweepers.
- Phil Reavis (1936–2026), American high jumper
- Rafi Reavis (born 1977), Filipino-American professional basketball player
- Wade Reavis (born 1876), American politician from North Carolina
- Waylon Reavis (born 1978), American metal vocalist

== People with the given name ==
- Reavis L. Mitchell Jr., American historian
- Reavis Z. Wortham, American writer

== Other ==
- HB Reavis, European real estate development company
- Reavis High School in Burbank, Illinois
- Reavis Falls in Arizona
