= Reaves =

Reaves is a surname. Notable people with the name include:

- Austin Reaves (born 1998), American basketball player
- Darrin Reaves (born 1993), American football running back free agent
- Emily Grace Reaves (born 2001), American actress and model
- James Reaves (born 1982), American basketball player
- Jeremy Reaves (born 1996), American football free safety
- Jessi Reaves (born 1986), American artist
- John Reaves (1950–2017), American football player
- Jordan Reaves (born 1990), Canadian football defensive lineman
- Ken Reaves (born 1944), American football defensive back
- Linda Reaves (1949–1985), American murder victim
- Mallory Reaves (born 1984), American writer
- Michael Reaves (1950–2023), American writer
- Pearl Reaves (1929–2000), American singer and guitarist
- Ryan Reaves (born 1987), Canadian-American professional ice hockey player
- Shawn Reaves (born 1978), American actor
- Willard Reaves (born 1959), American-Canadian gridiron football running back

== See also ==
- Reavis (disambiguation)
- Reeves (surname)
