= James Reeves =

James, Jim, Jimmy or Jamie Reeves may refer to:

- James Reeves (footballer) (1869–1937), English footballer who played in Spain
- James Reeves (physician) (1829–1896), American physician
- James Reeves (writer) (1909–1978), British writer
- Jimmy Reeves (1904–1974), American boxer
- Jim Reeves (1923–1964), American country and popular music singer-songwriter
- James J. Reeves (born 1938), member of the Florida House of Representatives
- Jamie Reeves (footballer) (born 1953), football pundit and former footballer
- Jamie Reeves (born 1962), former coal miner, strongman and professional wrestler
- James Reeves (baseball) (born 1993), American pitcher
- Nathan West (General Hospital) or James Nathan Reeves, a character from General Hospital

== See also ==
- James H. Reeve, English broadcaster
- James Knapp Reeve, American literary critic
- Reeves (disambiguation)
