= Henry Reeve =

Henry Reeve may refer to:

- Henry Reeve (physician) (1780–1814), English physician
- Henry Reeve (journalist) (1813–1895), English journalist
- Henry Reeve (soldier) (1850–1876), Cuban soldier
- Henry Reeve Brigade, Cuban disaster relief contingent of medical professionals

== See also ==
- Henry Reeves (disambiguation)
- Harry Reeve, boxer
