= Richard Reeves =

Richard Reeves may refer to:

- Richard V. Reeves (born 1969), British-American author and social scientist
- Richard Reeves (actor) (1912–1967), American character actor
- Richard Reeves (animator) (born 1959), abstract filmmaker
- Richard Reeves (American writer) (1936–2020), writer and lecturer
- Richard Reeves (New Zealand politician) (1836–1910), member of the Liberal Party
- Richard Ambrose Reeves (1899–1980), priest and anti-apartheid activist
- Richard Stone Reeves (1919–2005), equine painter

== See also ==
- Richard Reeve (fl. 1640–1680), English instrument maker
