= Henry Reeves (disambiguation) =

Henry Augustus Reeves (1832–1916) was a U.S. representative from New York.

Henry Reeves may also refer to:

- Henry E. Reeves, member of 6th Alaska State Legislature
- Henry Ethelbert Sigismund Reeves, publisher of The Miami Times, the oldest and largest black-owned newspaper in the southeast of the United States.
- Henry Reeves Park in Overtown
- Ellen Buckingham Mathews (1853–1920), writer also known as Mrs. Henry Reeves

== See also ==
- Harry Reeves (disambiguation)
- Henry Reeve (disambiguation)
