= John Reeve =

John Reeve may refer to:

- John Reeve (religious leader) (1608–1658), English plebeian prophet
- John Reeve (actor) (1799–1838), English comic actor
- John Reeve (businessman), executive with Willis Group Holdings
- John N. Reeve, American microbiologist
- John Reeve (bobsleigh) (born 1937), bobsledder who represented the United States Virgin Islands
- John Bunyan Reeve (1831–1916), Presbyterian minister and professor at Howard University
- John Reeve (mathematician), after whom the Reeve tetrahedra is named

== See also ==
- John Reeves (disambiguation)
