= History of Oxford =

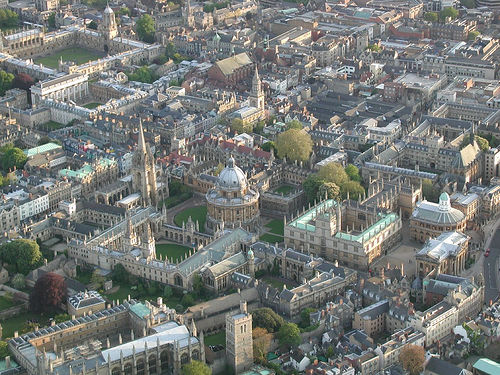
Aerial view of Oxford city centre

The history of Oxford in England dates back to its original settlement in the Saxon period. Originally of strategic significance due to its controlling location on the upper reaches of the River Thames at its junction with the River Cherwell. The town grew in national importance during the Norman period. The University of Oxford was established in the 12th century and would eventually dominate the activity within the town, this also resulted in several town and gown conflicts. The city was besieged during The Anarchy in 1142 and Oxford Castle was attacked during the Barons War in the early 13th century. Oxford was greatly affected during the English Reformation, brought on by Henry VIII in his dissolution of the monasteries. The town also played an important role in the English Civil War, where it experienced another siege when it housed the court of Charles I.

Later in the 19th and 20th century, the town grew and underwent an industrial boom where major printing and car-manufacturing industries began establishing in the city. These industries later declined in the 1970s and 1980s, leaving behind a city that is now well known for its education and tourist industry.

== Medieval period ==
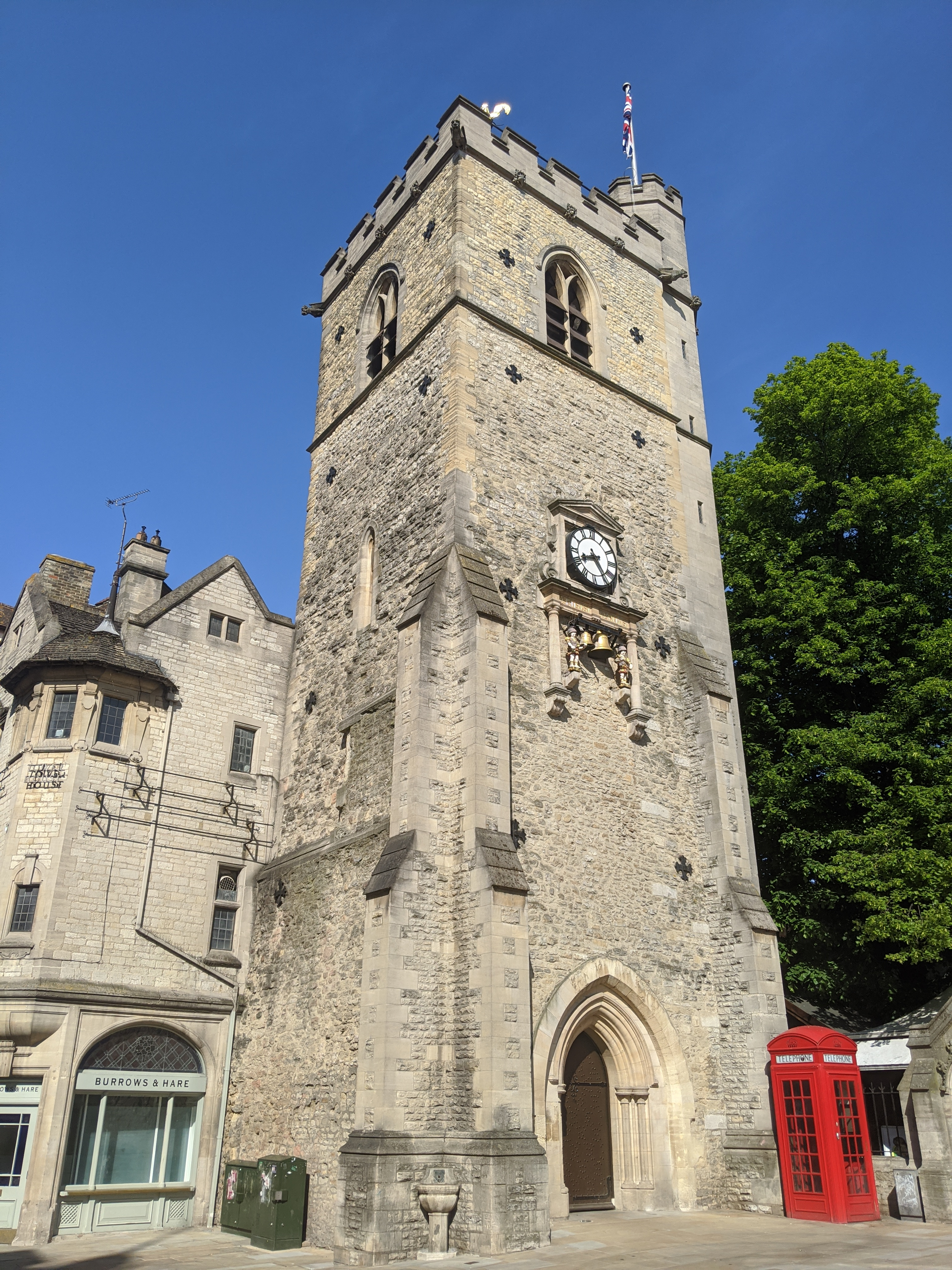
St Martin's Tower, commonly known as Carfax Tower, is all that remains of the 12th-century St Martin's Church

Oxford was first settled by the Anglo-Saxons and was initially known in Old English as Oxnaford and in Old Norse as Öxnafurða. The name comes from "oxen's ford", which literally meant oxen's shallow river crossing. Around 900, an important north–south route for cattle connecting the south of England to the Midlands needed to cross the River Thames. At Oxford, the Thames splits into many channels, offering a relatively shallow and hence crossable location for people, goods and animals. Oxford thus became a heavily trafficked crossing point and the early Anglo-Saxon settlement developed around the location. There is still speculation about the precise location of the ford that gave Oxford its name, though any approach to Oxford involved the use of several fords, and thus there were likely multiple fords in use throughout the history of the crossing. Most archeological evidence generally points to the south-west of Oxford where there are low elevations and branching streams that offer shallow crossings.

The earliest notice of the City of Oxford was mentioned in AD 912 in the Anglo-Saxon Chronicle, where it states that Edward, son of Alfred the Great came into possession of "London and Oxford and all regions which owed obedience to these cities".

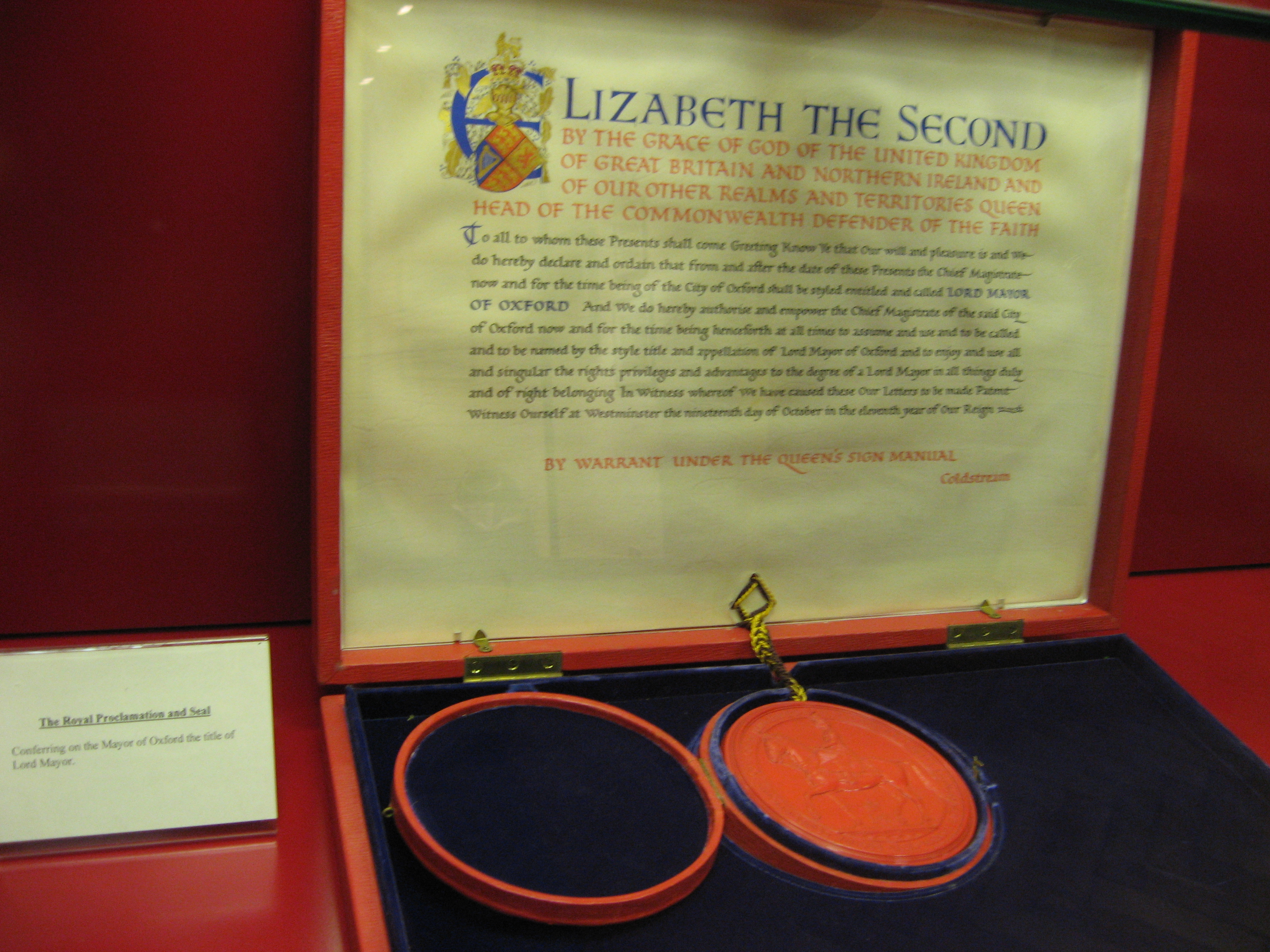
Royal proclamation granting Lord Mayoralty to Oxford

In the 10th century, Oxford became an important military frontier town between the kingdoms of Mercia and Wessex and was raided by Danes. The town was constructed on the northern bank of the river within Mercia, directly opposite the southern side within the territory of Wessex. In 1002, many Danes were killed in Oxford during the St. Brice's Day massacre ordered by Æthelred the Unready. The skeletons of more than 30 suspected victims were unearthed in 2008 during the course of building work at St John's College. The massacre was a contributing factor to King Sweyn I of Denmark’s invasion of England in 1003 and the sacking of Oxford by the Danes in 1004.

Oxford was heavily damaged during the Norman Invasion in 1066. Following the conquest, the town was assigned to a governor, Robert D'Oyly, who ordered the construction of Oxford Castle to confirm Norman authority over the area. Robert D'Oyly also ordered the construction of a stone causeway, known as Grandpont for traffic, including oxen and the carts that they drew, to cross over the flood plains. D'Oyly set up a monastic community in the castle consisting of a chapel and living quarters for monks (St George in the Castle). The community never grew large but it earned its place in history as one of Britain's oldest places of formal education. It was there that in 1139 Geoffrey of Monmouth wrote his History of the Kings of Britain, a compilation of Arthurian legends.

The earliest walls surrounding Oxford town were made of turf bank with a timber palisade. This was then replaced by stone and a ditch was made outside the walls, at least on the north side. The four main gates into Oxford had existed by the Medieval period; the Saxon tower, which originally served as the north gate, remains intact and eventually became incorporated into the structure of St. Michael's church.

During the period of Middle English, Oxford's pronunciation evolved to become Oxenford, as written in "Clerkes Tale of Oxenford" in Chaucer's The Canterbury Tales. In the 15th century Oxenford elided to become Oxford, as it is known today.

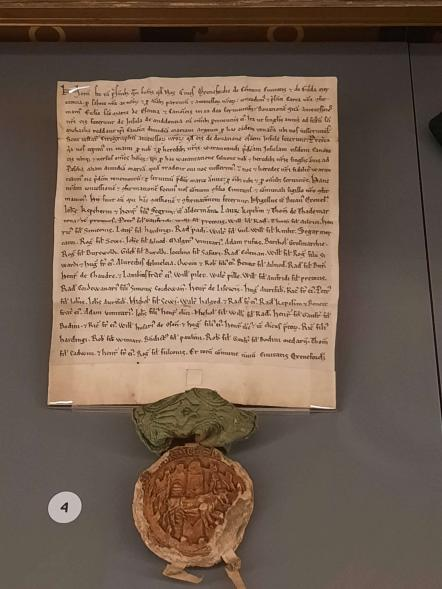
The Oxford city charter of 1191

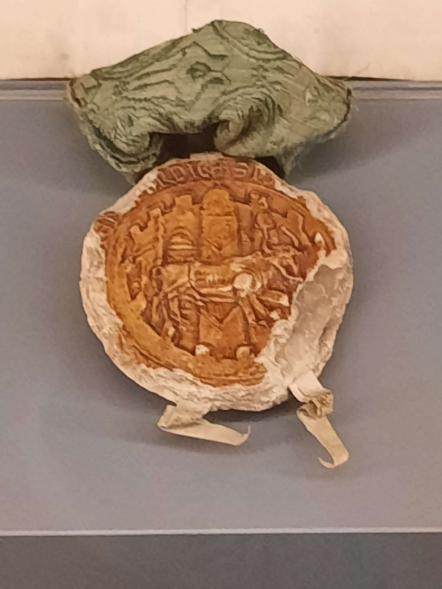
The city of Oxford in 1191

Additionally, there is evidence of Jews living in the city as early as 1141, and during the 12th century the Jewish community is estimated to have numbered about 80–100. The city was besieged during The Anarchy in 1142. In 1191, a city charter translated from Latin wrote:

"Be it known to all those present and future that we, the citizens of Oxford of the Commune of the City and of the Merchant Guild have given, and by this, our present charter, confirm the donation of the island of Midney with all those things pertaining to it, to the Church of St. Mary at Oseney and to the canons serving God in that place. Since, every year, at Michaelmas the said canons render half a mark of silver for their tenure at the time when we have ordered it as witnesses the legal deed of our ancestors which they made concerning the gift of this same island; and besides, because we have undertaken on our own part and on behalf of our heirs to guarantee the aforesaid island to the same canons wheresoever and against all men; they themselves, by this guarantee, will pay to us and our heirs each year at Easter another half mark which we have demanded; and we and our heirs faithfully will guarantee the aforesaid tenement to them for the service of the aforesaid mark annually for all matters and all services. We have made this concession and confirmation in the Common council of the City and we have confirmed it with our common seal. These are those who have made this concession and confirmation. (There follows a list of witnesses, ending with the phrase, "... and all the Commune of the City of Oxford.")

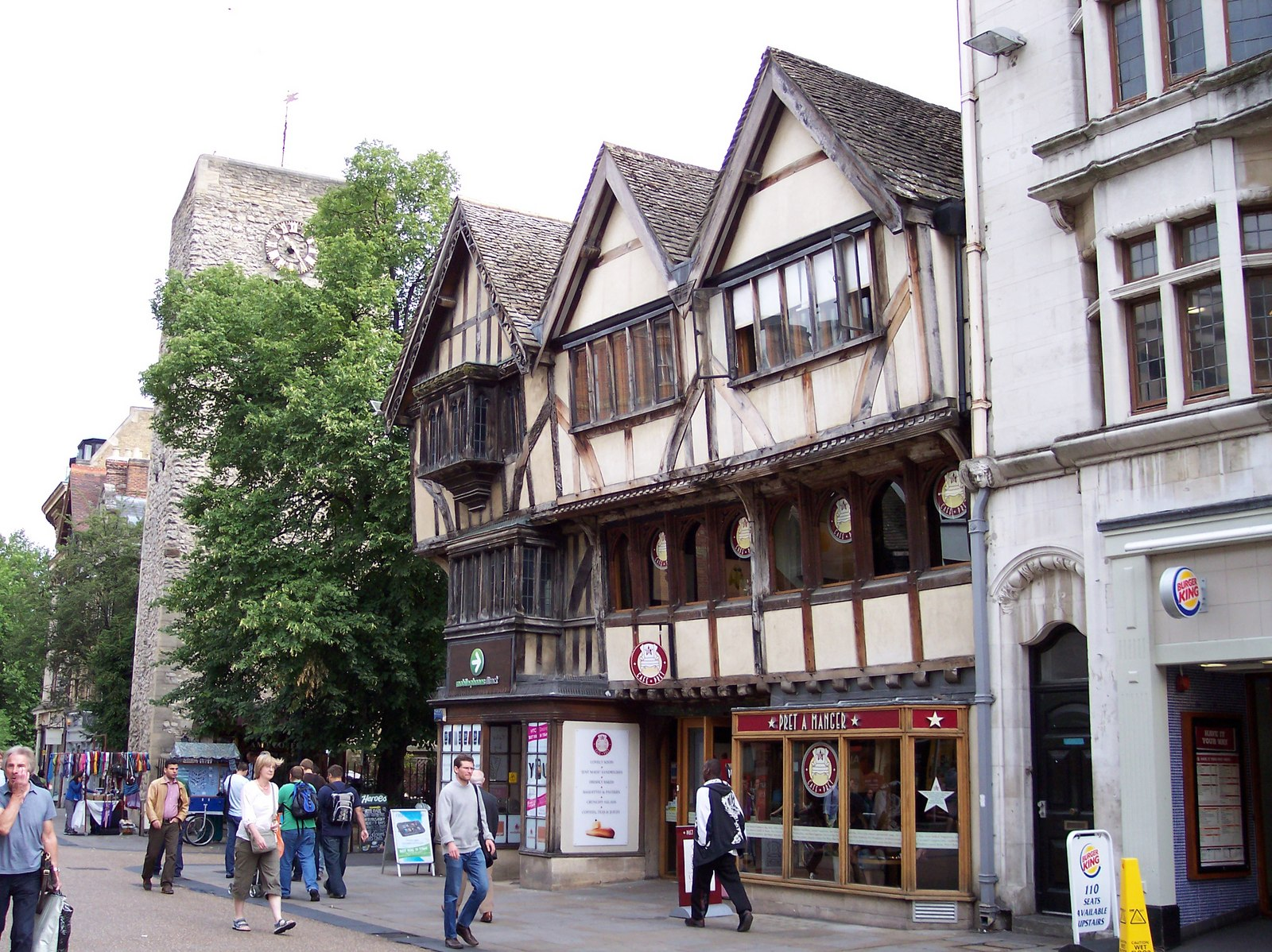
26-27 Cornmarket St., which dates to 1386; previously known as the New Inn

Oxford's prestige was enhanced by its charter granted by King Henry II, granting its citizens the same privileges and exemptions as those enjoyed by the capital of the kingdom; and various important religious houses were founded in or near the city. Oxford's status as a liberty obtained from this period until the 19th century. A grandson of King John established Rewley Abbey for the Cistercian Order; and friars of various orders (Dominicans, Franciscans, Carmelites, Augustinians and Trinitarians) all had houses of varying importance at Oxford. Parliaments were often held in the city during the 13th century. The Provisions of Oxford were instigated by a group of barons led by Simon de Montfort; these documents are often regarded as England's first written constitution. Richard I (reigned 1189–1199) and King John (reigned 1199–1216) the sons of Henry II, were both born at Beaumont Palace in Oxford, on 8 September 1157 and 24 December 1166 respectively. A plaque in Beaumont Street commemorates these events.

=== University of Oxford ===
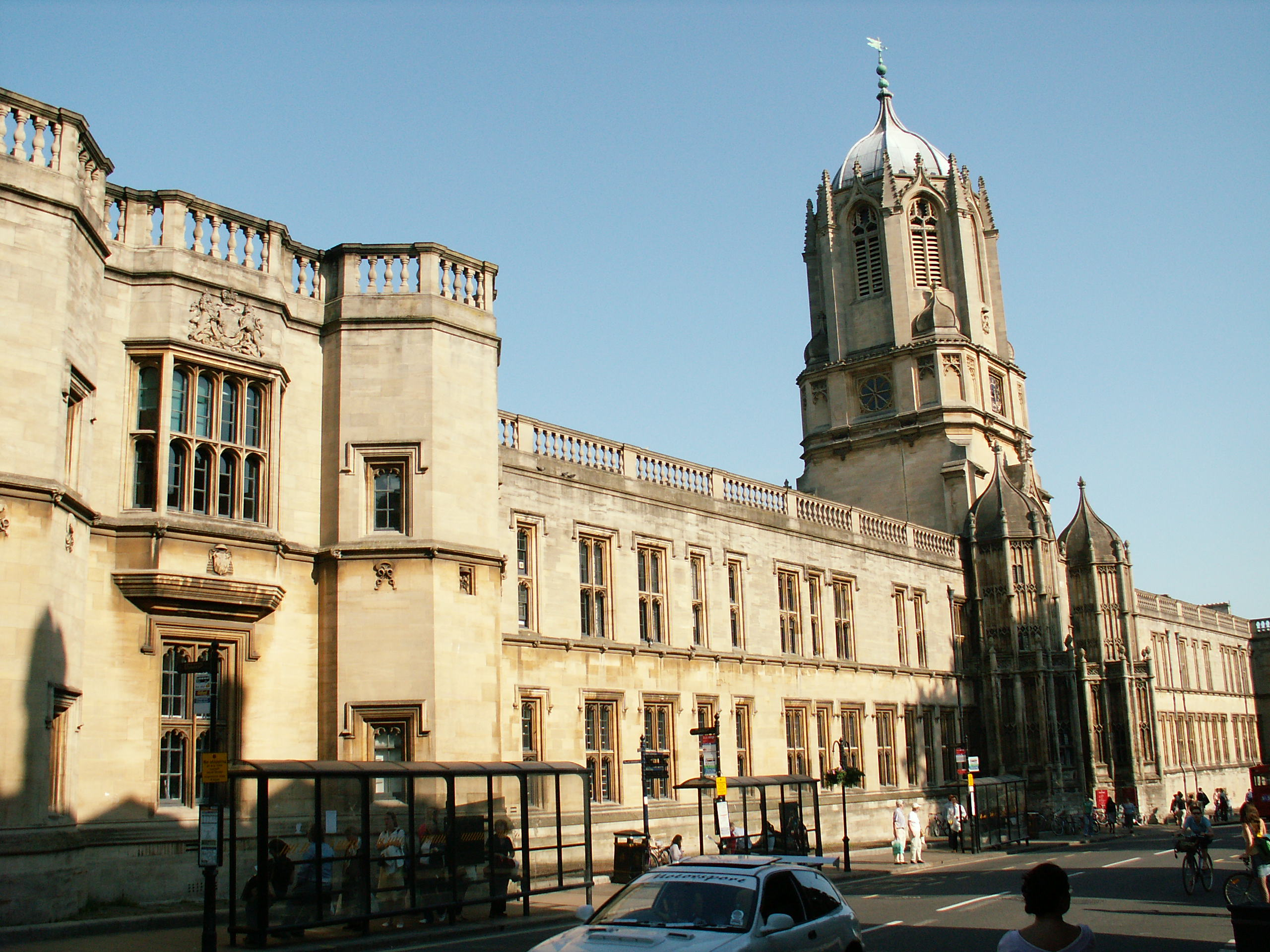
Christ Church, one of many constituent colleges of the University of Oxford, founded in the mid-16th century

The University of Oxford is first mentioned in 12th-century records. Evidence points to magistri teaching here around 1120. Scholars here provided monarchs with a pool of talented government employees, and benefices from the endowments of colleges provided royal civil servants at no cost to the crown. Of the hundreds of aularian houses that sprang up across the city, only St Edmund Hall (c. 1225) remains. What put an end to the halls was the emergence of colleges. Oxford's earliest colleges were University College (1249), Balliol (1263) and Merton (1264). These colleges were established at a time when Europeans were starting to translate the writings of Greek philosophers. These writings challenged European ideology, inspiring scientific discoveries and advancements in the arts, as society began to see itself in a new way. These colleges at Oxford were supported by the Church in the hope of reconciling Greek philosophy and Christian theology.

As a response to the killing of two students in 1209 by the local townspeople, a number of scholars left the town (some leaving to Cambridge to form a sister university). To prevent further troubles, the Papal Legate drew up the Oxford Ordinance in 1214 to grant special rights to scholars which placed them in a privileged position beyond the legal reach of the townspeople. The relationship between "town and gown" has often been uneasy – as many as 93 students and townspeople were killed in the St Scholastica Day Riot of 1355.

Attracted to the intellectual life of the University town, a group of friars (including Agnellus of Pisa) arrived in the early 13th century; the Greyfriars resided on the south part of the medieval town wall while the Blackfriars south of what is now Blue Boar Lane and then to a spot west of St Aldate's. It was here that several notable friars would emerge, such as Roger Bacon, Duns Scotus and William of Ockham. As the town declined economically in the later Middle Ages, the University gained greater power over the town at the expense of the urban community. The University also expanded its landholings and became a powerful employer and consumer of goods and services.

== Tudor period ==
Christ Church Cathedral, Oxford is unique in combining a college chapel and a cathedral in one foundation. Originally St Frideswide's Priory, the building was extended and incorporated into the structure of the Cardinal's College shortly before its refounding as Christ Church in 1546, since when it has functioned as the cathedral of the Diocese of Oxford.

The sweating sickness epidemic in 1517 was particularly devastating to Oxford and Cambridge where it killed half of both cities' populations, including many students and dons.

Oxford was not spared the turmoil of the Reformation, officials of the monarch threw out books relating to Roman Catholicism from Duke Humfrey's Library. The Oxford Martyrs were tried for heresy in 1555 and subsequently burnt at the stake, on what is now Broad Street, for their religious beliefs and teachings. The three martyrs were the bishops Hugh Latimer and Nicholas Ridley, and the archbishop Thomas Cranmer. The Martyrs' Memorial stands nearby, round the corner to the north on St Giles'.

== Early modern period ==
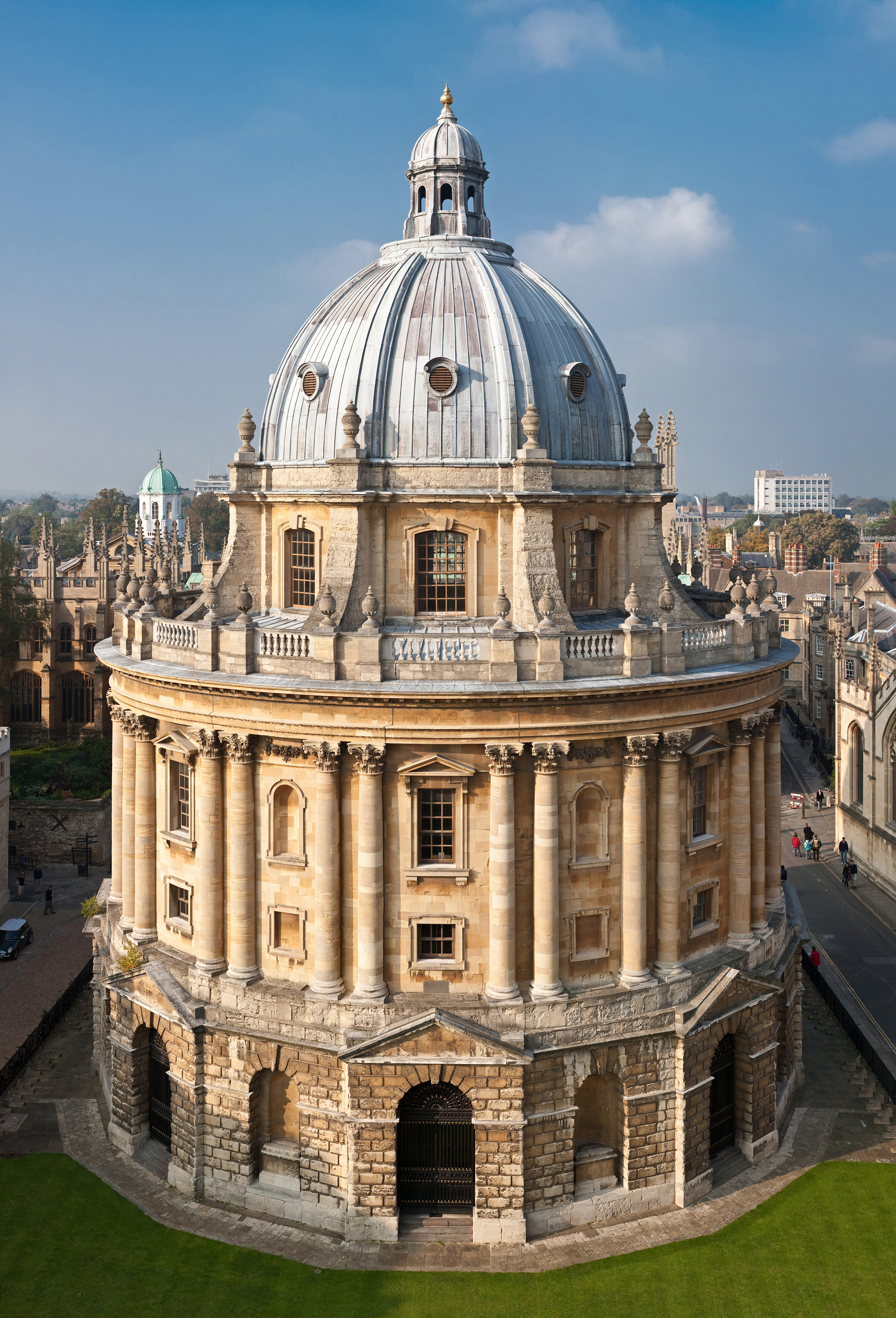
The Radcliffe Camera, completed in 1748

During the English Civil War, Oxford housed the court of Charles I in 1642, after the king was expelled from London. In 1646, during the Siege of Oxford, the town eventually surrendered to Parliamentarian forces commanded by General Fairfax, and occupied by Colonel Richard Ingoldsby. In the final period of the English Civil War in 1652, as news of Charles II approaching the city, the Parliamentarians proceeded to pull down defenses in the Oxford Castle where they were garrisoned and retreated to New College, this resulted in great damage to the college in the process. The city walls at this time was in very bad condition, the moat was rented as a fishpond, while the towers used as a space of residence. Therefore, a new set of ramparts had to be built to defend the town against any coming siege.

It later housed the court of Charles II during the Great Plague of London in 1665–1666. Although reluctant to do so, he was forced to evacuate when the plague got too close. The city suffered two serious fires in 1644 and 1671. The town underwent a radical makeover of its buildings during this period, with the most notable being Tom Tower in Christ Church, the Sheldonian Theatre and the Botanic Gardens.

The mid-to-late 18th century saw other great new landmarks added to the city such as the Radcliffe Camera and the Radcliffe Observatory. While in 1785, a new prison complex was built on the site of the old dilapidated Oxford Castle after it was judged to be in a poor state by John Howard, as the castle had been used as the local prison after the civil war.

== Late modern period ==
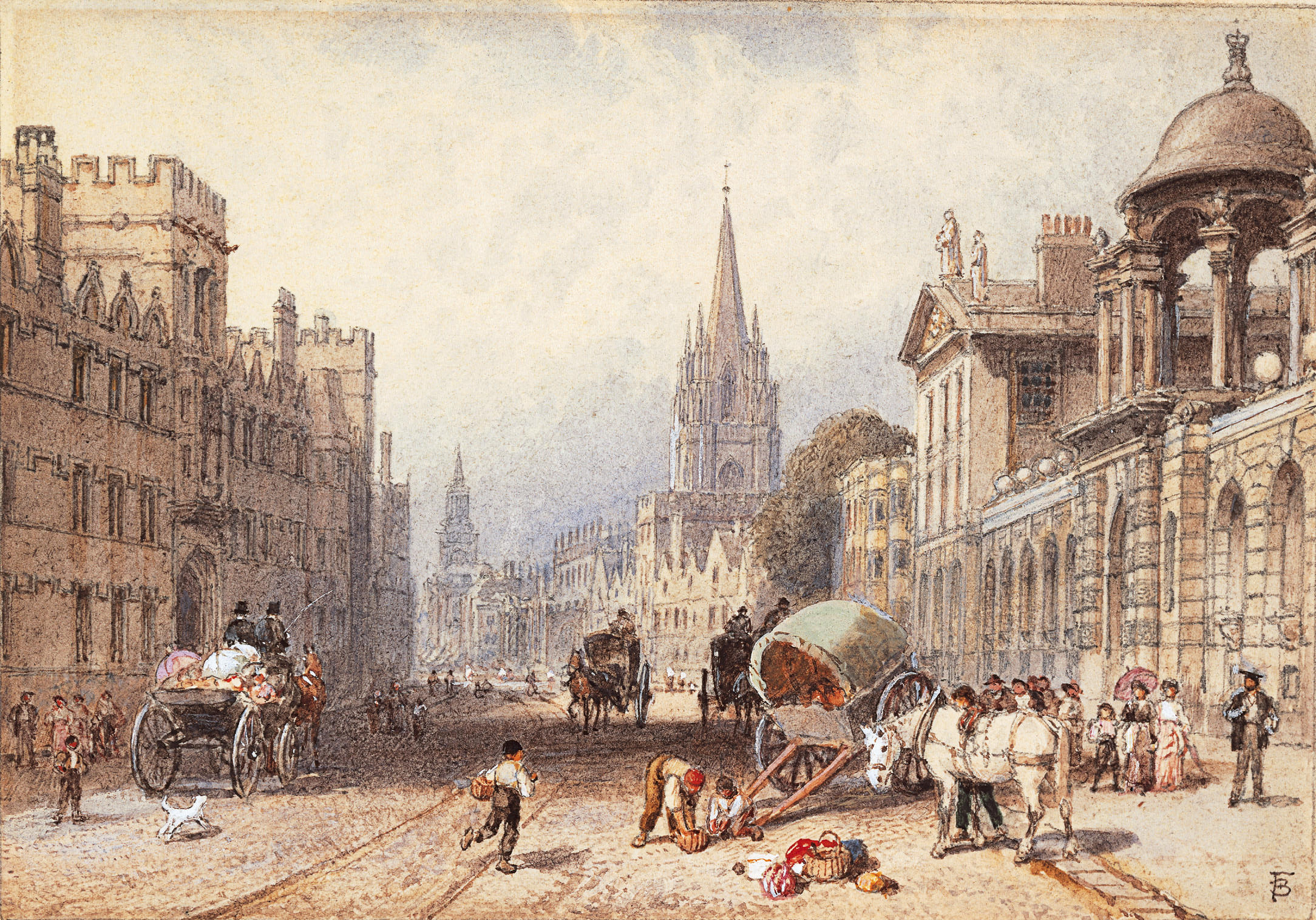
19th-century view of the High Street in Oxford.

In 1790, the Oxford Canal connected the city with Coventry. The Duke's Cut was completed by the Duke of Marlborough in 1789 to link the new canal with the River Thames; and, in 1796, the Oxford Canal company built its own link to the Thames, at Isis Lock. In 1844, the Great Western Railway linked Oxford with London via Didcot and Reading, and other rail routes soon followed. In the 19th century, the controversy surrounding the Oxford Movement in the Church of England drew attention to the city as a focus of theological thought. A permanent military presence was established in the city with the completion of Cowley Barracks in 1876.

Oxford Town Hall was built by Henry T. Hare; the foundation stone was laid on 6 July 1893 and opened by the future King Edward VII on 12 May 1897. The site has been the seat of local government since the Guild Hall of 1292 and though Oxford is a city and a Lord Mayoralty, the building is still called by its traditional name of "Town Hall".

== 20th and 21st centuries ==
During the First World War, the population of Oxford changed. The number of University members was significantly reduced as students, fellows and staff enlisted. Some of their places in college accommodation were taken by soldiers in training. Another reminder of the ongoing war was found in the influx of wounded and disabled soldiers, who were treated in new hospitals housed in buildings such as the university's Examination School, the town hall and Somerville College. During the Second World War, Oxford was largely ignored by the German air raids during the Blitz, primarily as it is thought that Hitler had plans to make Oxford the new capital city. Also perhaps due to the lack of heavy industry such as steelworks or shipbuilding that would have made it a target, although it was still affected by the rationing and influx of refugees fleeing London and other cities. The university's colleges served as temporary military barracks and training areas for soldiers before deployment.

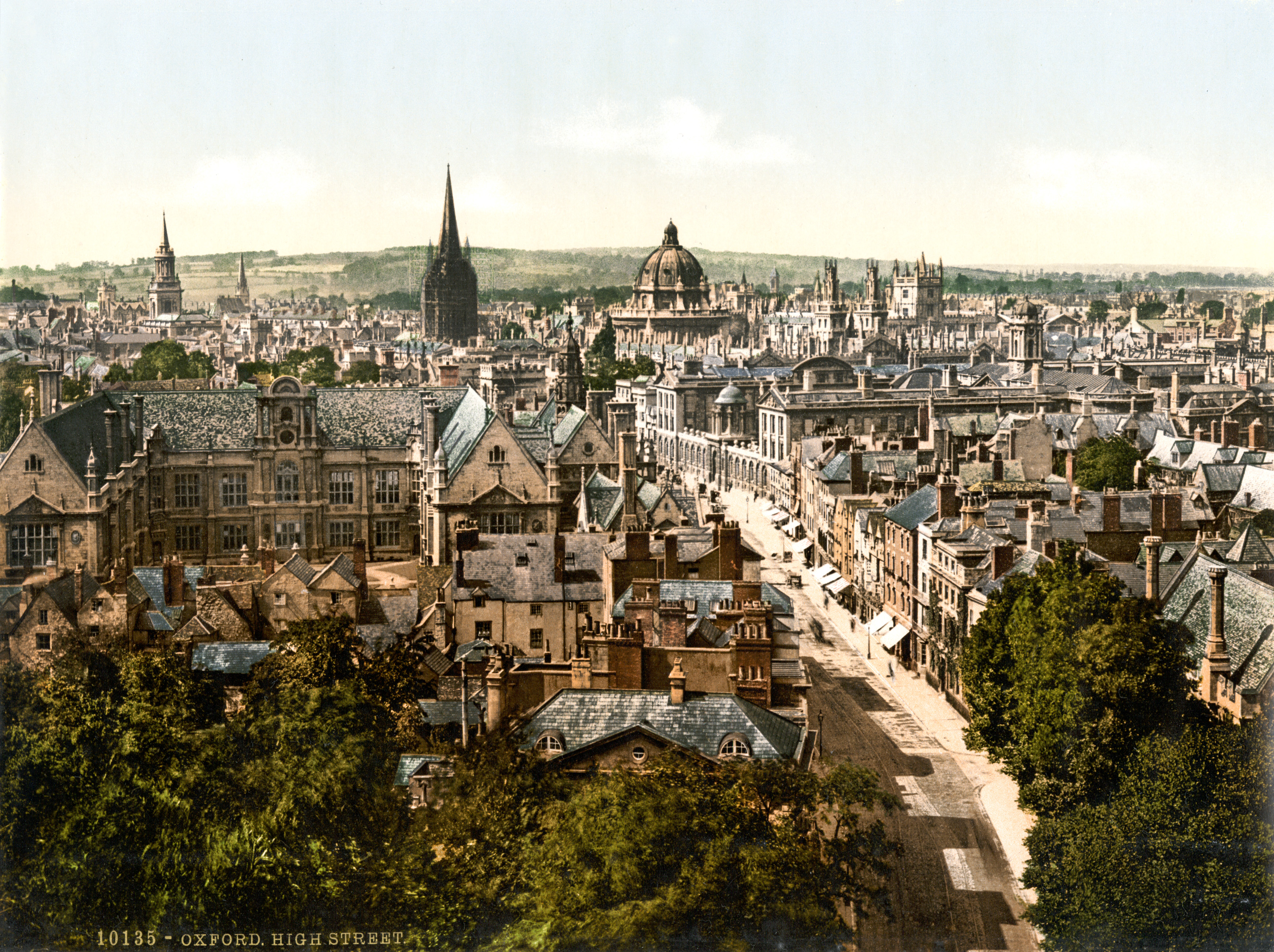
Photochrom of High Street, 1890–1900

By the early 20th century, there was rapid industrial and population growth, with the printing and publishing industries becoming well established by the 1920s. Also during the 1920s, the economy and society of Oxford underwent a huge transformation as William Morris established Morris Motors Limited to mass-produce cars in Cowley, on the south-eastern edge of the city. By the early 1970s over 20,000 people worked in Cowley at the huge Morris Motors and Pressed Steel Fisher plants. Oxford was now a city of two halves: the university city to the west of Magdalen Bridge and the car town to the east. This led to the witticism that "Oxford is the left bank of Cowley".

On 6 May 1954, Roger Bannister, a 25-year-old medical student, ran the first authenticated sub-four-minute mile at the Iffley Road running track in Oxford. Although he had previously studied at Oxford University, Bannister was studying at St Mary's Hospital Medical School in London at the time. He later returned to Oxford University and became Master of Pembroke College. Oxford's second university, Oxford Brookes University, formerly the Oxford School of Art, then Oxford Polytechnic, based at Headington Hill, was given its charter in 1991 and for ten years has been voted the best new university in the UK. It was named to honour the school's founding principal, John Henry Brookes.

Cowley suffered major job losses in the 1980s and 1990s during the decline of British Leyland, but is now producing the successful Mini for BMW on a smaller site. Much of the original car factory at Cowley was demolished in the 1990s, and is now the site of the Oxford Business Park. The influx of migrant labour to the car plants and hospitals, recent immigration from South Asia, and a large student population, have given Oxford a notably cosmopolitan character, especially in the Headington and Cowley Road areas with their many bars, cafes, restaurants, clubs, Asian shops and fast food outlets and the annual Cowley Road Carnival. Oxford is one of the most diverse small cities in Britain: the most recent population estimates for 2011 showed that 22% of the population were from black or minority ethnic groups, compared to 13% in England.

== Administrative history ==
Oxford was an ancient borough. It was described as having burgesses in 1086, and its earliest known municipal charter was issued around 1155 by Henry II. From the early 13th century the borough corporation was headed by a mayor.

The early borough was entirely in Oxfordshire, but from the late 13th century the borough was extended to also include a small part of Berkshire which lay north of the main channel of the Thames at the northern end of the Grandpont causeway (near the later Folly Bridge). The borough then straddled the two counties until 1889. Throughout the Middle Ages there were occasional disputes regarding the location of the borough boundaries and also the extent to which the corporation's jurisdiction applied to the university. Following the creation of the Diocese of Oxford in 1542 the borough also took on city status.

The Oxford constituency was enlarged in 1832 to take in an area south-east of the borough on the opposite side of the River Cherwell, including the growing suburbs around St Clement's Church. The borough was reformed to become a municipal borough in 1836 under the Municipal Corporations Act 1835, which standardised how most boroughs operated across the country. As part of the 1836 reforms, the municipal boundaries were enlarged to match the constituency.

The corporation's powers were primarily judicial rather than providing public services. A separate body of improvement commissioners was established in 1771 to maintain the city's streets. The commissioners were replaced in 1864 when a local government district was established, administered by a local board which also had responsibility for sewers, water supply, public health and other local government functions. The local government district initially matched the borough, but was enlarged in 1865 to take in parts of the neighbouring parishes of Cowley and North Hinksey to the south of the city. The district was further enlarged in 1875 to take in the tithing of Grandpont south of the Thames. The borough corporation and local board existed alongside each other with their differently defined areas and roles between 1864 and 1889.

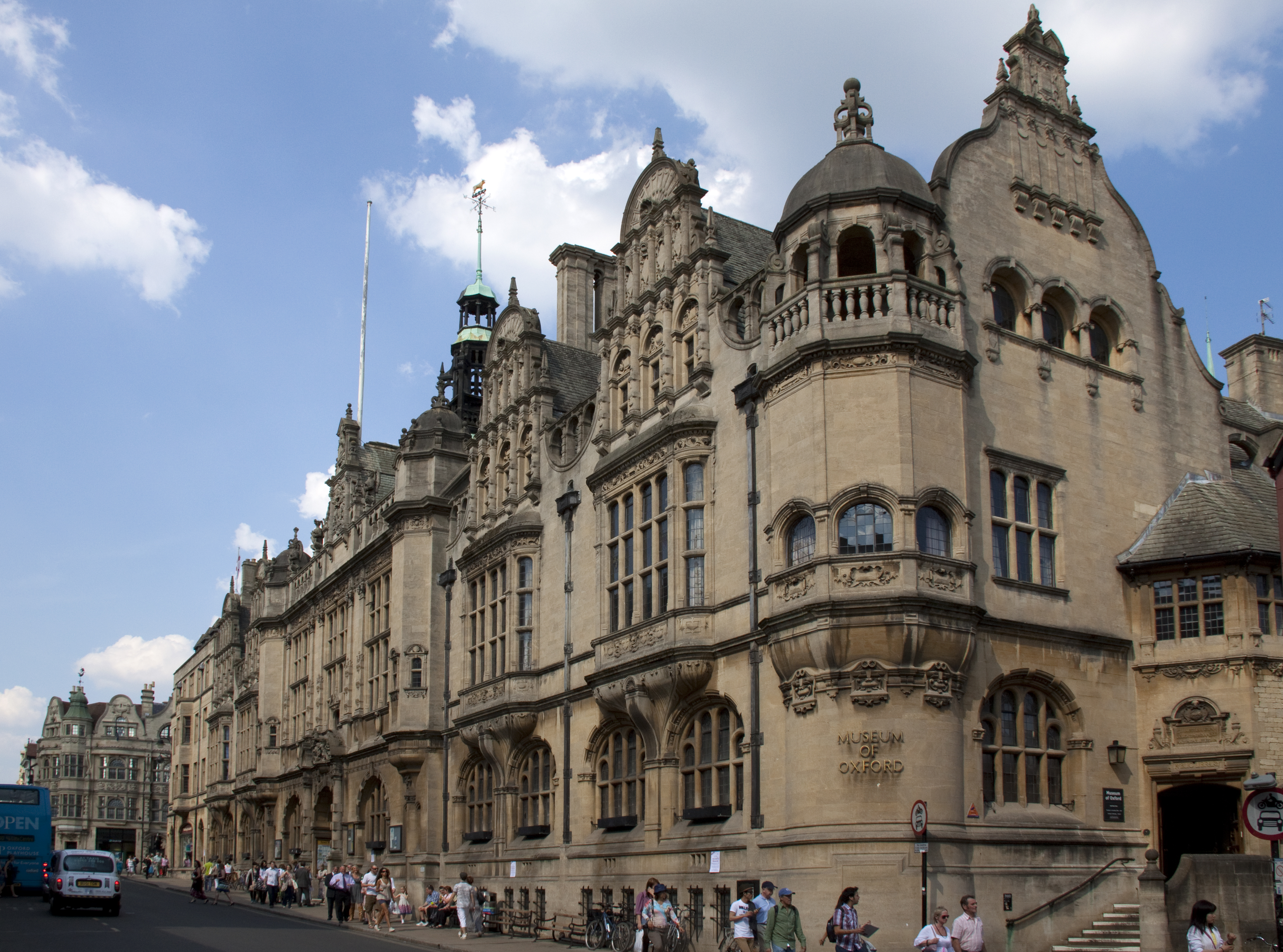
Oxford Town Hall: City Council's headquarters, built 1897

By 1889, Oxford was one of only fourteen towns or cities in England which still had a separate borough corporation and local board. The Local Government Act 1888 directed that urban sanitary districts which straddled county boundaries (as the Oxford local government district did) were to be placed entirely in the county which had the majority of the district's population. The 1888 Act also required the remaining cases where the borough corporation was not the urban sanitary authority to be resolved. As such, the parts of the Oxford local government district in Berkshire (principally Grandpont) were transferred to Oxfordshire with effect from 1 April 1889, in order to bring the whole district into Oxfordshire. Seven months later, on 9 November 1889, the local board's functions were transferred to the borough council and the borough was enlarged to cover the whole of the old local government district plus additional areas including New Hinksey south of the city and Summertown north of the city. The county boundary with Berkshire was adjusted again so that the borough as enlarged was wholly in Oxfordshire. As thus enlarged the city was considered large enough for the city council to also provide county-level functions, and so it was made a county borough, independent from Oxfordshire County Council.

In 1929 the boundaries of the city were extended to include the suburbs of Headington, Cowley and Iffley to the east, and Wolvercote to the north. The boundaries were extended again in 1957 to take in the Blackbird Leys estate to the south-east of the city. In 1962 the council was given the right to appoint a Lord Mayor.

In 1974, Oxford was made a non-metropolitan district under the Local Government Act 1972. It retained the same boundaries as had last been reviewed in 1957, but became a lower-tier district council, with Oxfordshire County Council providing county-level services in the city. Oxford's city status and lord mayoralty were transferred to the new non-metropolitan district created in 1974. The city boundaries were further enlarged in 1991 to take in Littlemore, Marston, and Risinghurst and Sandhills.

== See also ==
- St. Brice's Day massacre (1003)
- Siege of Oxford (1142)
- Oxford Parliament (1258)
- St Scholastica Day riot (1355)
- Oxford Martyrs (1555)
- Oxford Parliament (1644)
- Oxford Parliament (1681)
- Timeline of Oxford

== Bibliography ==
=== Published in the 19th century ===
- George Alexander Cooke (1800), "Oxford", Topographical and statistical description of the county of Oxford, London: Printed for C. Cooke, OL 7126442M
- J.N. Brewer (1813), "Oxford", Beauties of England and Wales, vol. 12, London: J. Harris, hdl:2027/yale.39002040781982
- New Pocket Companion for Oxford, Oxford: Printed for J. Cooke, 1814, OCLC 43132323, OL 20441538M
- James Ingram (1837), Memorials of Oxford, Oxford: J. H. Parker
- "Oxford", Great Western Railway Guide, London: James Wyld, 1839, OCLC 12922212
- Oxford University and city guide, on a new plan, Oxford: Henry Slatter, 1841, OL 13510937M
- "Oxford", Black's Picturesque Tourist and Road-book of England and Wales (3rd ed.), Edinburgh: Adam and Charles Black, 1853
- Theodore Alois Buckley (1862), "Oxford", Great Cities of the Middle Ages (2nd ed.), London: Routledge, Warne, & Routledge
- James J. Moore (1878), Historical handbook and guide to Oxford (2nd ed.), Oxford: T. Shrimpton and Son, OL 6296488M
- Edward C. Alden (1890), Alden's Oxford Guide (16th ed.), Oxford: Alden & Co., OCLC 10923077, OL 23324274M
- "Oxford", Great Britain (4th ed.), Leipsic: Karl Baedeker, 1897, OCLC 6430424
- Charles Gross (1897). "Oxford". Bibliography of British Municipal History. New York: Longmans, Green, and Co.
- Visitor's guide to Oxford, Oxford: Parker & Co., 1897, OCLC 13779765, OL 25410017M

=== Published in the 20th century ===
- Edward Thomas; John Fulleylove (1903). Oxford. Colour Books. London: A. & C. Black.
- Andrew Lang (1906). Oxford. Boston: Cornhill Publishing Co. OL 13507496M.
- Cecil Headlam (1907). The story of Oxford. London: Dent & Co. OL 14043719M.
- Rhoda Murray (1912). The making of Oxford. Oxford: B.H. Blackwell. OL 25402026M.
- Edward Godfrey Cox (1949). "Cambridge and Oxford". Reference Guide to the Literature of Travel. University of Washington publications. Language and literaturev. 9-10, 12. Vol. 3: Great Britain. Seattle: University of Washington. hdl:2027/mdp.39015049531448 – via HathiTrust.
- W. N. Hargreaves-Mawdsley (1973). Oxford in the Age of John Locke. Centers of Civilization Series. USA: University of Oklahoma Press. ISBN 9780806110387. OL 5284855M.
- A. R. Woolley (1975). The Clarendon Guide to Oxford (3rd ed.). Oxford University Press. ISBN 0-19-951047-4.
- Christopher Hibbert, ed. (1988). The Encyclopaedia of Oxford. Macmillan. ISBN 0-333-39917-X.
- Simpson, Bill (1997). A History of the Railways of Oxfordshire. Vol. Part 1: The North. Banbury and Witney: Lamplight. ISBN 1-899246-02-9.

=== Published in the 21st century ===
- Simpson, Bill (2001). A History of the Railways of Oxfordshire. Vol. Part 2: The South. Banbury and Witney: Lamplight. ISBN 1-899246-06-1.
- Daniel A. Bell; Avner de-Shalit (2011), "Oxford", Spirit of Cities: Why the Identity of a City Matters in a Global Age, Princeton, NJ: Princeton University Press, ISBN 9780691151441
