= Charles G. Reavis =

American politician from North Carolina (1892–1984)

Member of the North Carolina Senate from the 24th district

Personal details
- Born: May 31, 1892 Yadkin County, North Carolina, U.S.
- Died: December 7, 1984 (aged 92) Yadkin County, North Carolina, U.S.
- Party: Republican

Charles George Reavis (born May 31, 1892 – December 7, 1984) was an American politician who served in the North Carolina Senate. A Republican, he represented the 24th district. Reavis was born in Yadkin County, North Carolina. He also served as sheriff of Yadkin County.

He lived in Yadkinville.
