= Harry Reeves =

Harry Reeves may refer to:

- Harry Gosford Reeves (1896–1918), British military aviator
- Harry Wendell Reeves (1910–2001), American sports shooter
- Harry Reeves (screenwriter), of Fun and Fancy Free and other Disney films
- Harry Reeves (animator), of Egyptian Melodies and other Disney films

== See also ==
- Harry Reeve (1893–1958), British boxer
- Henry Reeves (disambiguation)
