= James Knapp Reeve =

James Knapp Reeve

James Knapp Reeve (May 19, 1856 – October 25, 1933), known as "the dean of professional literary critics", was an American litterateur, author, textbook writer, literary critic, and publisher of Franklin, Ohio.

== Biography ==
Reeve was born May 19, 1856, in Hancock, New York.

He was proprietor of The Editor; the Journal of Information for Literary Workers of Franklin, Ohio. He wrote two novels: Vawder's Understudy and The Three Richard Whalens. In addition to being the editor or contributor to several additional works, he served as a staff contributor to Harper's Weekly and was a special correspondent for The Philadelphia Ledger in Europe.

Around 1904, Reeve started in the publishing business in Deposit, New York with The Bohemian and The Grey Goose, fiction monthlies. Later, he bought Brains, an advertising publication, and renamed it The Retail Advertiser and Brains. His company started to publish Outing, and in 1905, Reeve decided to get control of the magazine, the main offices of which were moved to Deposit. He organized the Outing Publishing Company, and Charles P. Knapp, of the banking firm of Knapp Brothers, became its president, and Reeve became secretary and general manager. The company took over the three Reeve magazines and branched out extensively in the publishing business. A large printing plant was acquired and considerable book work and job printing undertaken.

He married Carrie Denise Reeve; they had a daughter, Agnes. James Knapp Reeve died in Franklin, Ohio, October 25, 1933.

== Selected works ==
=== Author ===
- Vawder's understudy; a study in platonic affection, 1896
- The Three Richard Whalens: A Story of Adventure, 1897, illustrated by Edmund Frederick
- Practical authorship. A work designed to afford writers an insight into certain technical, commercial, and financial aspects of the profession of letters as followed by the general writer for current publication, 1900
- The flight of the Hebrews; told for young readers, 1902, with Calvin Dill Wilson
- The Writer's Book: A Compendium of Information Upon Matters Pertaining to the Trade of Authorship, c. 1922

=== Editor ===
- Five Hundred Places to Sell Manuscripts: A Manual Designed for the Guidance of Writers in Disposing of Their Work, c1894
- 1001 Places to Sell Manuscripts: A Complete Guide for All Writers who are Seeking Avenues for the Publication of Original Manuscripts, 1921
- The New 1001 Places to Sell Manuscripts: A Complete Guide for All Writers Who are Seeking Avenues for the Publication of Original Manuscripts, 1922

=== Contributor ===
- The Thirty-Six Dramatic Situations, 1921, by Georges Polti, translated by Lucille Ray

== Gallery ==
The art of inventing characters

The new 1001 places to sell manuscripts; a complete guide for all writers who are seeking avenues for the publication of original manuscripts

Plotting the short story, a practical exposition of germ-plots, what they are and where to find them- the structure and development of the plot; and the relation of the plot to the story

Practical authorship. A work designed to afford writers an insight into certain technical
