= Reavis Falls =

Seasonal waterfall in Arizona

Coordinates: 33.53285°N 111.167083°W

Reavis Falls is a seasonal waterfall located within the Superstition Mountains in Arizona. The falls are named after Elisha Marcus Reavis, who had a ranch, farm, and orchard in the Superstition Mountains a few miles south of the falls.
