= Siege of Oxford (1142) =

1142 siege during the Anarchy

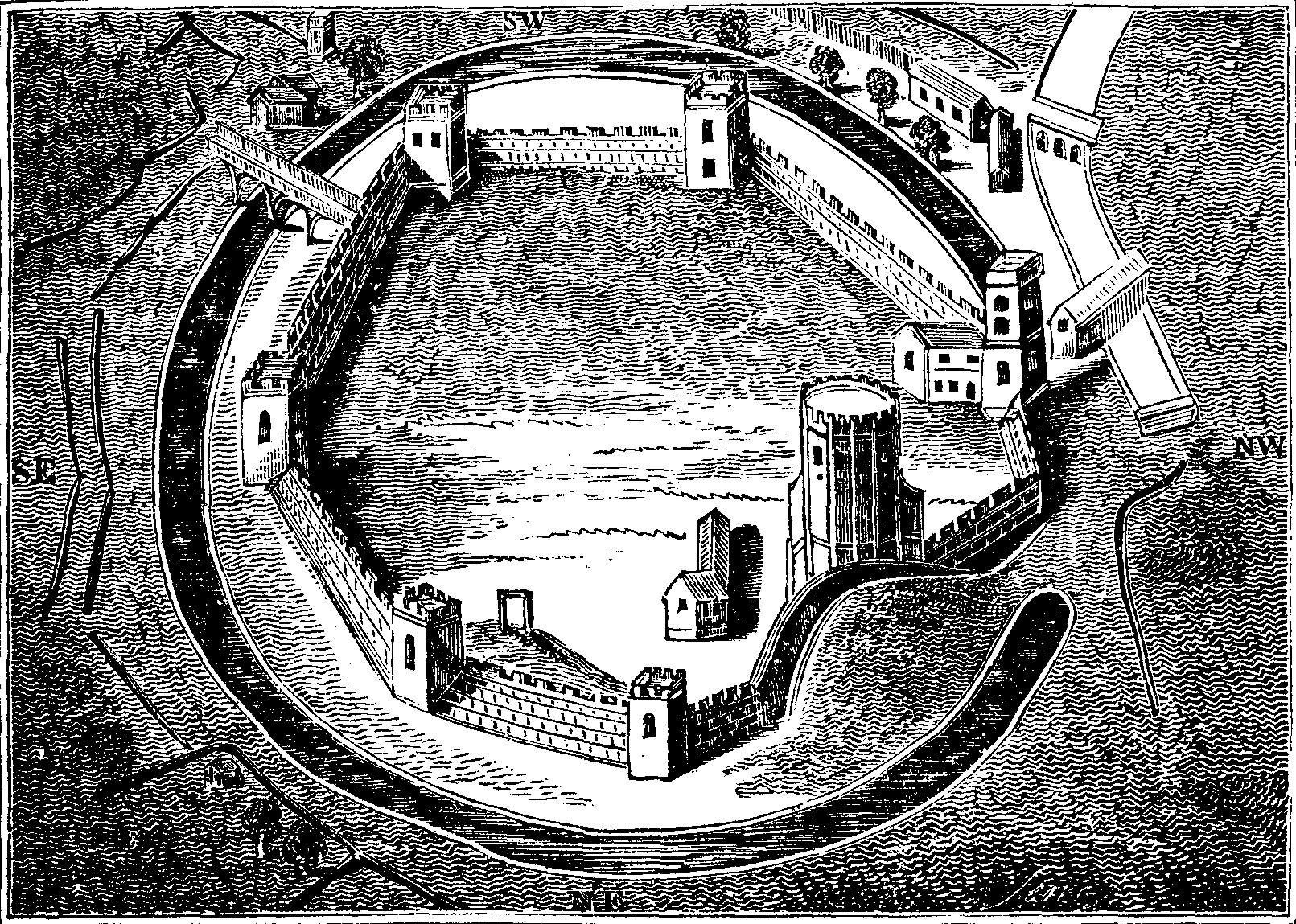
Illustration of Oxford Castle based on a 16th-century woodcut

The siege of Oxford took place during the Anarchy, a period of civil war following the death of Henry I of England without a male heir, in 1142. Fought between his nephew, Stephen of Blois, and his daughter, the Empress Matilda (or Maud), (Note: Maude is a vernacular form of the name Matilda and frequently used interchangeably; in Latin she was known as Mathildis Imperatrix. She had borne the title Empress since her marriage to Henry V, Holy Roman Emperor, who had died in 1125. Three years later she had married Geoffrey, Count of Anjou.) who had recently been expelled from her base in Westminster and chosen the City of Oxford as her new headquarters. Oxford by now was effectively a regional capital and important in its own right. It was a well-defended city with both rivers and walls protecting it, and was also strategically important as it was at a crossroads between the north, south-east and west of England, and also not far from London.

By now the civil war was at its height, yet neither party was able to get an edge on the other: both had suffered swings of fate in the last few years which had alternately put them ahead, and then behind, their rival. Stephen, for instance, had been captured by Matilda's army in 1141, but later in the year, Matilda's half-brother and chief military commander, Robert, Earl of Gloucester was captured by Stephen's army. Likewise, Matilda had been recognised as "Lady of the English" but had not long afterwards been run out of London.

Stephen believed that all it would take to win the war decisively would be to capture Matilda herself; her escape to Oxford seemed to present him with such an opportunity. Having raised a large army in the north, he returned south and attacked Wareham in Dorset; this port town was important to Matilda's Angevin party as it provided one of the few direct links to the continent that they controlled. He attacked and captured more towns as he returned to the Thames Valley, and soon the only significant base Matilda had outside of the south-west—apart from Oxford itself—was at Wallingford Castle, held by her close supporter Brian Fitz Count.

Stephen's army approached Oxford on 26 September 1142, and according to contemporary accounts, swam his army across the rivers and waterways that blocked the approach to the city. Matilda's small force was taken by surprise. Those that were not killed or captured retreated into the castle; Stephen now controlled the city, which protected him from counterattack. The king knew he was unlikely to be able to take the castle by force—although that did not stop him from using the latest siege technology. He also knew that it would be a long, hard wait before Matilda was starved out. But after nearly three months of siege, conditions for the garrison were dire, and they formed a plan to help the Empress escape from under Stephen's nose. One early December evening Matilda crept out of a postern door in the wall—or, more romantically, possibly shinned down on a rope out of St George's Tower—dressed in white as camouflage against the snow and passed without capture through Stephen's lines. She escaped to Abingdon Abbey and then to Wallingford Castle where she was safe; Oxford Castle surrendered to Stephen the following day, and the war continued punctuated by a series of sieges for the next 11 years.

== Background ==
Map of southern England and Wales showing areas controlled by King Stephen (red) and Empress Matilda (blue), c. 1140; principal locations given.

Henry I died without a male heir in 1135, leading to a succession crisis. His only legitimate son and heir, William Adelin, had died in the sinking of the White Ship in 1120. Henry wished his daughter the Empress Matilda, to succeed him, but female succession rights were ill-defined at this time—indeed, there had not been an uncontested succession to the Anglo-Norman patrimony during the previous sixty years. On Henry's death in 1135, his nephew Stephen of Blois claimed and seized the English throne; fighting broke out within a few years, eventually becoming a fully-fledged rebellion against Stephen, as Matilda also claimed the English throne. By 1138 the dispute had escalated into a civil war known as the Anarchy. (Note: The use of the term "the Anarchy" to describe the civil war has been subject to much critical discussion. The phrase itself originates in the late Victorian period. Many historians of the time traced a progressive and universalist course of political and economic development in England over the medieval period. William Stubbs, following in this "Whiggish" tradition, analysed the political aspects of the period in his 1874 volume the Constitutional History of England. This work highlighted an apparent break in the development of the English constitution in the 1140s, and caused his student John Round to coin the term "the Anarchy" to describe the period. Later historians criticised the term, however, as analysis of the financial records and other documents from the period suggested that the actual breakdown in law and order during the conflict had been more nuanced and localised than chronicler accounts alone might have suggested. Further work in the 1990s reinterpreted Henry's efforts in the post-war reconstruction period, suggesting a greater level of continuity with Stephen's wartime government than had previously been supposed. The label of "the Anarchy" remains in use by modern historians, but rarely without qualification.) The Empress Matilda had recently been expelled from Westminster Palace by rebellious Londoners, who had "swarmed out like angry wasps" from London, while Stephen's queen—also named Matilda—approached Southwark from Kent. The Empress Matilda—"in great state", reported James Dixon Mackenzie—evacuated to Oxford in 1141, (Note: King suggests that Oxford's proximity to Wallingford was also influential on her choice; her father had had a hunting lodge, and had effectively retired there. She may also have been influenced by the fact that one of her supporters, Brian Fitz Count, held Wallingford Castle.) making it her headquarters and setting up her Mint. (Note: Matilda's "moneyer" was a man named Swetyng; the pennies he produced for her were never minted outside the areas directly under her control. Minting money was not, at this time, solely the purview of the crown; it was not unusual for barons to also do so, the most illustrious example of such being Matilda's half-brother, the Earl of Gloucester.) Prior to her eviction from Westminster, she had made some political gains, having captured King Stephen and been recognised as "the Lady of the English". Although Matilda never matched the King in wealth, both sides' armies probably ranged in size from 5,000 to 7,000 men.

=== Oxford ===
Oxford itself had become increasingly important by this period, and, in the words of historian Edmund King, it was "in the course of becoming a regional capital". It also had a royal castle. Its value for whoever held it was not merely symbolic; it was also of great practical value. It was particularly secure, surrounded as it was, says the author of the Gesta Stephani, by "very deep water that washes it all around" (Note: King, discussing the approach of the Gesta's author, writes that he "liked to provide a thumbnail sketch of each settlement [that he came to] and he writes in what now would be thought of as estate agents' prose".) and ditches. The Berkshire-Oxfordshire interface area was a contentious one throughout the war, and Oxford particularly was of great strategic value. It was situated at the nexus of the main routes from London to the south-west and from Southampton to the north. Whoever controlled the Oxford area effectively controlled access to London and the north, and for Stephen it provided a bridgehead for attacking Matilda's south-western heartlands.

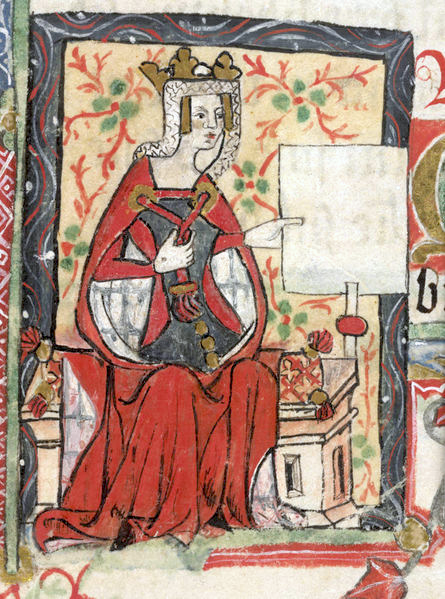
The Empress Matilda, from a medieval manuscript

Although the size of the army Matilda took with her to Oxford is unknown, it contained only a few barons with whom she could keep a "small court", and for whom she could provide from the local lands of the royal demesne. (Note: She had, after all, says Chibnall, not only to pay the wages of her soldiery and the overall costs of the campaign, but also to compensate, as best she could, those of her supporters who had had estates confiscated by the King.) Oxford's relative proximity to the capital, suggests Bradbury, also made it a "brave move" on her part; it probably also indicates that she did not wish to move too far and that she intended to return to, and reclaim, London in due course.

Matilda recognised that her lack of resources meant that she could not bring the war to a decisive close at this point, and so she sent her half-brother, Robert, Earl of Gloucester, to her husband, the Count of Anjou, to try to bring him and his large, experienced army in on her side. Matilda and the earl probably assumed that she would be safe in Oxford until he returned. This was a crucial period for Matilda, says King, and Gloucester's absence weakened her force further: he left for Normandy on 24 June to negotiate with Anjou, despite, says Crouch, Matilda's situation being "desperate". However, she considered Oxford to be her "own town", commented the 17th-century antiquarian Samuel Daniel. Stephen had recently been so ill that it was feared, temporarily, that he was dying; this created a degree of popular sympathy for him, which had already welled up following his release from Matilda's captivity the previous November. (Note: Stephen had been captured at the battle of Lincoln on 2 February 1141. Although Stephen appears originally to have been kept in relatively good conditions, sympathy arose at least partly because it was suspected that he had been maltreated while in captivity. The Gesta Stephani described the King as living in a "narrow dungeon", and he may have been fettered in chains; although William of Malmesbury asserts that Gloucester had due regard for the "splendour of the crown". Matilda, in any case, was "irretrievably damaged" politically as a result. Stephen was eventually released after the Rout of Winchester on 4 September 1142, at which Robert of Gloucester was captured and subsequently exchanged for the King.) A. L. Poole described the train of events thus:

At the Christmas [1141] festival, celebrated at Canterbury, Stephen submitted to a second coronation, or at least wore his crown, as a token that he once again ruled over England. The affairs of the kingdom, a visit to York, and an illness, so serious that it was rumoured that he was dying, prevented the king from taking steps to complete the overthrow of his rival who remained unmolested at Oxford. It was not till June that he was sufficiently recovered to take the field.

— A. L. Poole

Matilda and Gloucester, on the other hand, did not know that he was on the road to recovery; if they had, suggests R. H. C. Davis, they might not have delayed or even cancelled his journey. However, they did not, and Matilda's army was effectively left leaderless. Matilda may have been expecting supporters to make their way to Oxford—"to 'make fine' with her" (i.e. to contract themselves to her cause), suggests Edmund King—"but they were under no compulsion to do so". It is likely, says Professor H. A. Cronne, that by now "the tide had turned and already men were quietly leaving her court". John Appleby, too, has suggested that much of her support had by now decided that, in his words, they had "bet on the wrong horse", particularly as she had failed to put up a stand at Westminster or immediately return in force. Stephen, on the other hand, had recuperated in the north of England; he had a solid base of support there and was able to raise a large army—possibly over 1,000 knights—before returning south.

== The siege ==
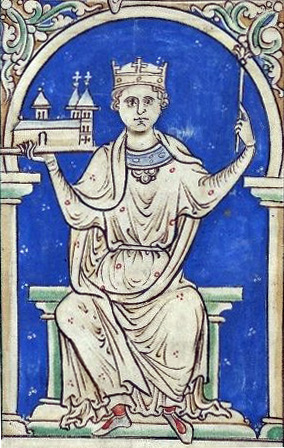
King Stephen, in a 13th-century illustration by Matthew Paris

Following Stephen's recovery, says the author of the anti-Angevin Gesta, the King acted like a man "awakened as out of sleep". (Note: The identity of the author of the Gesta has never been ascertained; it is possible, says Helen Castor, that he was Robert of Lewes, Bishop of Bath, "but, whoever he was, he was certainly a partisan of Stephen's".) He approached Oxford rapidly from the south-west; although the size of his army is unknown, (Note: Both Stephen and Matilda's armies are unknown quantities; however, when Henry landed in 1153, William of Newburgh says that he had 3,000 knights, which in turn Crouch describes as modest for the period, although he also presents reasons why the chronicler's estimate could have been inflated.) he had already won a series of small but significant victories, punching a gap into the Angevin-controlled south-west. This won him the port town of Wareham—cutting the Angevins' line of communication with their continental heartlands (Note: Wareham was of particular strategic significance, as it was held by the Earl of Gloucester; he had sailed from Wareham port on his voyage to Normandy, and, says Crouch, Stephen's victory denied Gloucester his easiest point of return to England. It was also of general strategic importance, argues Chibnall, because the Angevin party needed a secure port to connect them to the continent.)—and Cirencester, as well as the castles of Rampton and Bampton. (Note: Along with Wallingford, Oxford was also the most easterly point of the salient representing Angevin influence, which was concentrated in the south-west of England, and along with Woodstock Castle, Cirencester, Rampton and Bampton, formed a front line.) The capture of those two castles, in turn, cut Matilda's lines of communication between Oxford and the south-west and opened the Oxford road to Stephen on his return. He probably travelled via Sherborne, Castle Cary, Bath and Malmesbury, all of which were held by his supporters (and conversely, suggests Davis, avoided Salisbury, Marlborough, Devizes and Trowbridge, which were held for the Empress).

Stephen arrived at the river bank looking over to Oxford on the evening of 26 September 1142: the city was unprepared for his arrival. David Crouch comments that the King "had chosen his time well": the city's and castle's previous castellan, Robert d'Oilly had died a fortnight earlier and his successor had yet to be appointed. Thus the only military presence in Oxford was the Empress' armed householdmen, a relatively small force of soldiers. They "bravely or foolishly turned out to dispute his crossing of the river", and, thinking themselves secure, taunted Stephen's army from the safety of the city's ramparts, raining them with arrows shot across the river. While the Queen's army offered battle outside the city, Stephen was intent on besieging the castle without a battle, but this meant taking the city first. Stephen's men had to navigate a series of watercourses, what the Gesta describes as an "old, extremely deep, ford". (Note: This ford, which locals used to drive oxen across to market, gave the city its name. Horace Round compares the manner of Stephen's crossing here—"half-fording, half-swimming"—as predating a similar situation at the Battle of the Boyne in 1690.) They successfully crossed—at least one chronicler believed them to have swum at one point—and entered Oxford the same day by a postern gate. The Empress' garrison, both surprised and outnumbered, and probably panicking, beat a hasty retreat up to the castle. Those that were caught were either killed or kept for ransom; the city itself was looted and burned. Matilda was thus stranded in Oxford Castle with an even smaller force than that she had entered the city with. (Note: Horace Round speculated that she may well have witnessed the rout of her army from the castle ramparts.)

Stephen's primary objective in besieging Oxford was the capture of the Empress rather than the city or castle itself, (Note: This was not uncommon; notwithstanding the political significance of Matilda specifically, castellans were often the target of a siege. In Matilda's case, Stephen's task was made all the more difficult by Matilda's gender: says Helen Castor, "if Matilda's sex denied her the benefits of military leadership, it also protected her from the dangers of war. However great Stephen's triumphs, this was one enemy who would never be killed or captured in combat",) reported the chronicler John of Gloucester. Another, William of Malmsbury, suggests that Stephen believed that capturing Matilda would end the civil war in one fell stroke, and the Gesta declares that "the hope of no advantage, the fear of no loss" would distract the King. This was public knowledge, and for the Earl of Gloucester in Normandy, gave his mission an added urgency. Oxford Castle was well provisioned, and a long siege was inevitable; but Stephen was "content to endure a long siege to starve out his prey, even though the winter conditions would be horrible for his own men" say Gravett and Hook. (Note: In any case, sieges were the usual method of prosecuting this war; William of Malmesbury noted—and complained—that "the whole year was troubled by the brutalities of war. There were many castles all over England, each defending its own district, or, to be more truthful, plundering it. The war, indeed, was one of sieges. Some of the castellans wavered in their allegiance, hesitating which side to support, and sometimes working entirely for their own profit".) Stephen, though, had a good grasp of siegecraft. He prevented the besieged from foraging by pillaging the surrounding area himself, and showed a certain ingenuity in his varied use of technology, including belfries, battering rams and mangonels. This allowed him, points out Keith Stringer, to attack the city walls both up-close and from afar simultaneously.

This same year the king besieged the empress at Oxford, from after the feast of Michaelmas [29 September], until the advent of our Lord [29 November]; but during that period (sometime about Christmas-tide) the Empress escaped by night and crossed the Thames, which at that time was frozen over. She had dressed in white, and thus avoided the observation of the besiegers, the ground being covered with snow at the time. She went to Wareng [Wallingford], and so at length, Oxford surrendered to the king.

— The Chronicle of Robert de Monte

Stephen did not hesitate. He made his headquarters in what was later known as Beaumont Palace, just outside the city wall's north gate. Although not particularly well fortified, it was easily defensible with a strong wall and gate. (Note: Kings Richard I and John were later born in this palace in 1157 and 1167 respectively.) He brought up siege artillery, which he placed on two artificially constructed siege mounts called Jew's Mount and Mount Pelham, situated between Beaumont Palace and the north wall. (Note: These are still to be seen on maps of later centuries (e.g. that of 1578), but had been built over by the 18th century.) These kept the castle under suppressing fire, and it is possible that these mounds, being so close together, were more like a motte-and-bailey structure on the edge of the city, rather than two discrete siege works. (Note: Building small counter-castles was a favoured tactic of King Stephen during the civil war. When a castle was too powerful to be overcome in the short term, a siege castle need only be garrisoned by a small force, but could still wear down the garrison and prevent them from foraging at will, and allowed Stephen to keep the bulk of his army together where he needed it.) Apart from effecting damage to the castle, they had the added benefit of worsening the morale of the inhabitants. Meanwhile, the King's guards kept watch for the Empress 24 hours a day. Because Stephen had been able to take the city without damaging its walls, these now worked in his favour and meant he could press his attack against Matilda while protecting his flanks. The added consequence for Matilda was that it made rescue even more difficult, as whoever undertook the mission would have to dislodge Stephen from the well-fortified walls before even reaching the siege. There was a locus of sympathisers about 13 miles (21 kilometres) away, at Wallingford Castle (Note: Marjory Chibnall has described Wallingford as the Empress' "bastion in the Thames Valley" and as "impregnable [and] supported by vassals who were throughout the years of war as unshakably loyal to him as [FitzCount] himself was to his lady. Besieged on several occasions, the castle never fell to Stephen's forces. Such conduct was exceptional; as the rivals manoeuvred for position there were many who hesitated between them".) says Crouch, but they were "impotent" to reach her or help her escape. Bradbury suggests that they probably lacked numerical superiority over the King's army and that this deterred them. Matilda's small force, meanwhile, remained "pinned down" by the royal blockade, and eventually began to run low on provisions.

In December the Earl of Gloucester returned to England, bringing with him a force of between 300 and 400 men and knights in 52 ships. In a sop to Matilda's demands, the Count had allowed her nine-year-old son Henry to accompany the earl. His mission to bring the Count and his army to England had been a failure. Anjou had refused to leave Normandy or make any attempt to rescue his wife; perhaps, says Cronne, "it was just as well he did, for the English barons would certainly have regarded him as an unwelcome intruder". (Note: R. H. C. Davis has suggested that Anjou, who had requested that Gloucester come to him, as the only member of Matilda's circle he knew and therefore trusted to negotiate with, had never had any intention of coming to England. But, says, Davis, Anjou's military campaign in Normandy was stalling, and Gloucester's personal presence in the Count's Angevin army would improve Anjou's credentials to the Norman baronage, whom he was attempting to persuade to transfer their allegiance to him.) On Gloucester's return he placed Wareham under siege, probably hoping that Stephen would raise his siege at Oxford and come to the relief of Wareham; but if it was a bait, Stephen—perfectly aware of his advantageous position in Oxford—did not take it.

== Matilda's escape ==
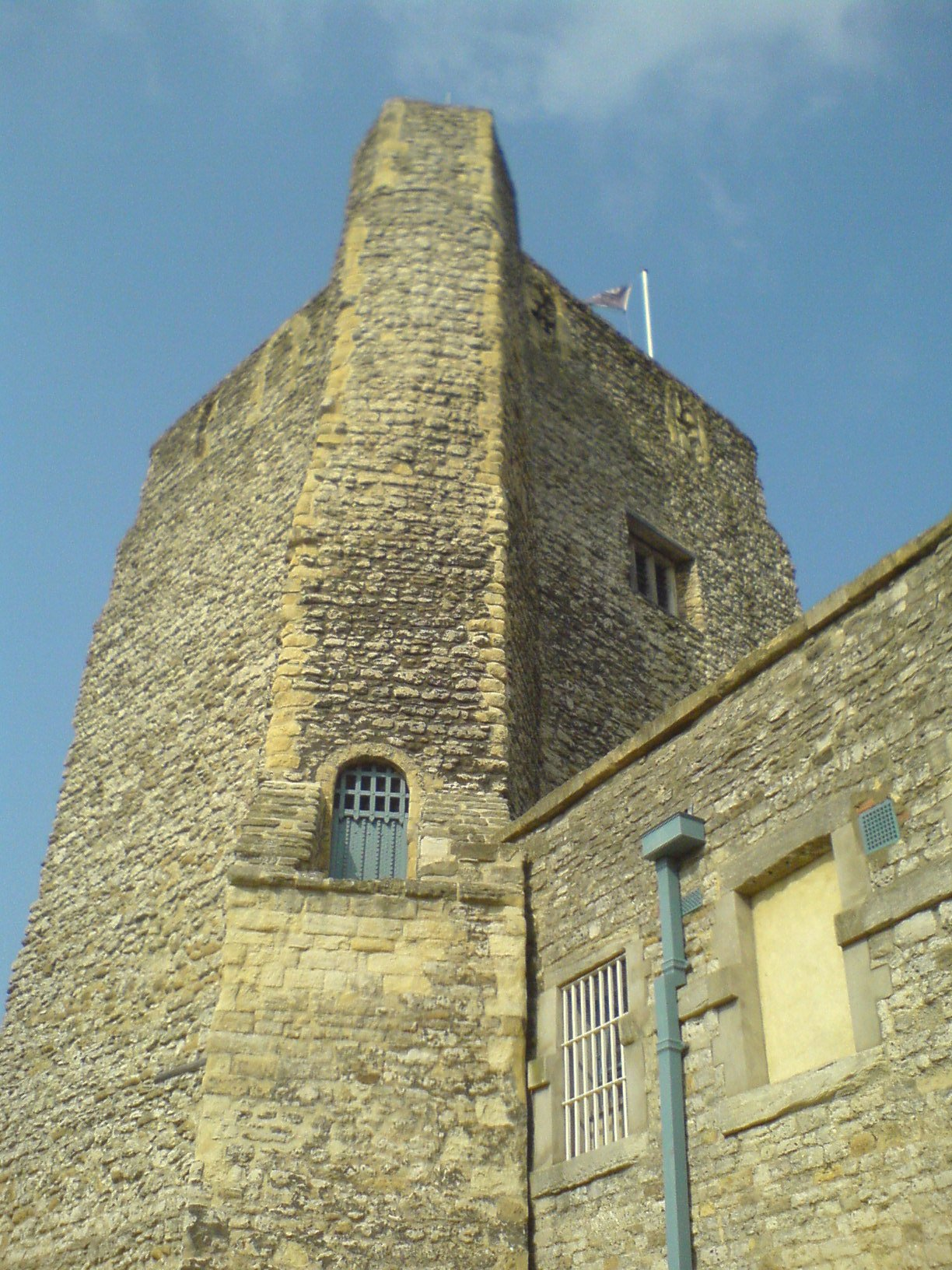
St George's Tower, Oxford Castle, in 2007

For the second time in the war, Stephen almost succeeded in capturing Matilda, but for the second time also, failed in the attempt. (Note: The previous year Matilda had again only narrowly escaped capture by the King's forces at the Battle of Winchester. At Oxford, though, says Crouch "matters were even more desperate...There was no Earl of Gloucester or Earl of Hereford to mastermind her escape and protect it with a rearguard action".) After three months' siege, supplies and provisions within Oxford Castle had become dangerously low, and, suggests Castor, "trapped inside a burned and blackened city, Matilda and her small garrison were cold, starving and almost bereft of hope." Matilda – thanks to the "ingenuity" of her garrison, says David Crouch and accompanied by four knights – escaped from St George's Tower one night in early December. She managed this, says J. O Prestwich, because, due to the duration of the siege, elements within Stephen's army had "deserted and others grew slack". (Note: Crouch posits that they were very likely disillusioned—"the exhaustion and lethargy that eventually undermines any civil war") Matilda took advantage of the weakened siege; she may have been assisted by treason within Stephen's army. (Note: Author Richard Brooks has suggested that the royal army "refused to await an Angevin relief column gathering at Cirencester". The historian Richard Barber says that "Robert, once he had achieved his immediate object and made the coast secure for a possible retreat, moved north to Cirencester with Henry, and assembled forces with which to march to the relief of Oxford. But Matilda decided that more urgent action was required".) If not treachery, says Davis, then certainly carelessness. In any case, he goes on, it prevented Stephen from achieving his primary aim: to win the war in one fell swoop. Matilda's escape to Wallingford contributed to her reputation for luck, which was seen as verging on the miraculous. The contemporary chronicler of the Gesta Stephani – who was highly partisan to Stephen (Note: Elsewhere the chronicler refers to Matilda's arrogance, arbitrary nature and as "breathing a spirit of unbending hautiness". He only ever calls her Countess of Anjou, never Empress. Edmund King notes that the Gesta does indeed typecast Matilda but also, occasionally, sources sympathetic to her report similar characteristics, although "more obliquely", such as those described by Frank Barlow: "arrogance sharpebned by humiliation and intransigence heightened by failure were fatal to her cause".)—wrote how:

I have never read of another woman so luckily rescued from so many mortal foes and from the threat of dangers so great: the truth being that she went from the castle of Arundel uninjured through the midst of her enemies; she escaped unscathed from the midst of the Londoners when they were assailing her, and her only, in mighty wrath; then stole away alone, in wondrous fashion, from the rout of Winchester, when almost all her men were cut off; and then, when she left besieged Oxford, she came away safe and sound?

— Gesta Stephani

Matilda's escape was, true to her reputation, embroidered by contemporaries, who asked many questions as to how she had managed it. The chroniclers tried to answer them, embellishing as they did. It was the last, and probably most dramatic event of Matilda's career, a career punctuated with dramatic events. It is also the final chapter in William of Malmesbury’s Historiae Novellae; he was the first to suppose that she escaped by way of a postern gate and walked to Abingdon. The Anglo-Saxon Chronicle—itself relying heavily on Malmesbury —adds the possibility that she had descended from the walls by rope. The Gesta Stephani adds that not only was there thick snow but the river had frozen. Henry of Huntingdon then garnishes the whole with the escapees' white cloaks. Edmund King has suggested that many of these explanations can be traced to other, often mythological or biblical events that would have been a point of reference for ecclesiastical chroniclers. They suggested that she had climbed down a rope out of her window (but, says King, "this was the manner of St Paul's escape from his enemies at Damascus"), that she had walked on water to cross Castle Mill Stream ("but this sounds more like the Israelites crossing the Red Sea than the traversing of an established thoroughfare", and the Thames may well have been frozen), according to Henry of Huntingdon, wrapped in a white shawl as camouflage against the snow. (Note: Matilda's escape was caricatured by Sellar and Yeatman in their 1930 book, 1066 and All That that "after this Stephen and Matilda (or Maud) spent the reign escaping from each other over the snow in night-gowns while 'God and his Angels slept'".) This was not achieved without alerting the Stephen's guards: they were not asleep, and as she slipped out, there was the sound of trumpets and men's shouting, their voices carrying through the frosty air" as Matilda and her knights slipped through Stephen's ranks. There had been a recent snowfall, which shielded her from her enemies but also hindered her passage. However precisely the escape was achieved, says Edmund King, it had clearly been thoroughly planned. The castle surrendered the day after Matilda's escape, and Stephen installed his own garrison. The siege had lasted over two and a half months.

Having made "the last and most remarkable of her escapes", says King, Matilda and her companions made their way—or "fled ignominiously", he suggests—to Abingdon where they collected horses and supplies, and then further to Wallingford, where they could rely on the support of Fitz Count, and where they met up with Gloucester. Stephen, meanwhile, took advantage of Gloucester's presence in Wallingford to make an (unsuccessful) attempt to recapture Wareham, which the earl had refortified after recapturing it.

== Aftermath ==
[Matilda's] reputation went before her. The Empress of the Romans, the daughter of the mighty Henry, the Lady of the English, was now reduced to the ranks of the ladies who lunched.

— Edmund King

Oxford has been described as Stephen's "key target" of 1142, and David Crouch suggests that the loss of Oxford was tactically such a disaster as to be Matilda's Stalingrad: "A final redoubt from which retreat would signal the beginning of the end for her cause." Stephen, says the Gesta Stephani, now controlled most of the region and commanded the Thames Valley. He already controlled the capital and the south-east; now, says Poole, "all hopes of Angevin success eastward of the upper Thames valley" were dashed. Matilda's escape was, in itself, not a victory—if anything, says King, it highlighted the fragility of her position—and by the end of the year, the Angevin cause was, in Crouch's words, "on the ropes" and what remained of its army demoralised. This, he says, is evidenced by the fact that even though the Earl of Gloucester had returned from Normandy in late October, it took him until December to re-establish himself in his Dorsetshire heartlands, (Note: Gloucester had recaptured Wareham after a three-week siege, during which he allowed the besieged to send to the King for assistance. However, "Stephen was too much occupied with the siege of Oxford, and no relief came", says A. L. Poole. Gloucester was not able to begin rebuilding the Angevin army until December, following his eventual recapture of Cirencester,) as he wanted to reassert his control over the whole Dorset coast. Wallingford was now the sole Angevin possession outside of the West Country; Stephen, however—although waging what Barlow has described as a "brilliant tactical campaign, distinguished by personal bravery"—had also lost the momentum he had built up since his release from captivity, and had missed his last chance to end the war decisively, as he had planned, with Matilda's capture. On her arrival in the west, her party set to work consolidating what it still held, being by now unable to regain lost lands. Popular rumour held that Matilda made a vow, following her escape, to found a new Cistercian Abbey. David Crouch, though, suggests that she made this up years later in order to justify policy, (Note: This is likely, says Crouch, because although contemporaries knew of Matilda's vow, there was confusion as to where she had supposedly made it. Monks at La Valasse Abbey were under the impression that she made it escaping Oxford, while, for example, the monks of Mortemer Abbey thought it was as a result of surviving a shipwreck. Crouch says that the most likely reason for this confusion is that she "invented the story for the occasion",) and Geoffrey White notes that she did not endow an abbey until 1150, when she committed, "at the suggestion of the Archbishop of Rouen, to co-operate in the founding of Le Valasse".

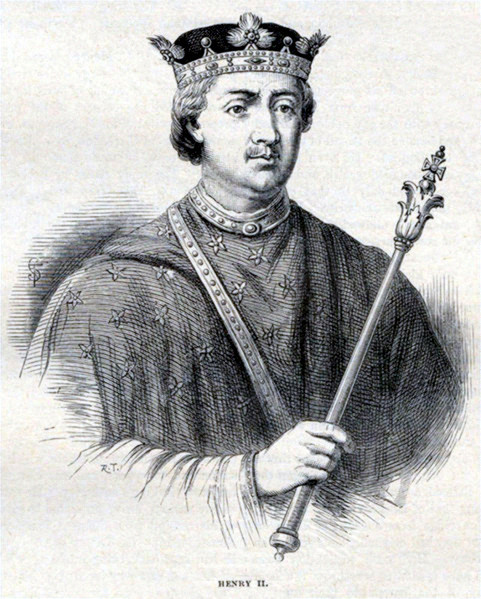
King Henry II, as imagined in Cassell's History of England in 1865

Stephen's exact movements after the siege are hard to establish; Oxford Castle dominated the surrounding countryside, and he probably took advantage of his new-found lordship to spend considerable time and resources subduing the countryside around Oxford. After all, says Emilie Amt, in the county generally, "far more important than the Angevins' one-time foothold here were the Angevin loyalties of many Oxfordshire barons". Stephen knew Matilda had fled to Wallingford after her escape, but made no effort to stop her. Stephen had attempted to besiege the castle in 1139, Fitz Count had "strengthened the already impregnable castle" over the years, as well as having sufficient provisions to hold out for several years, which Stephen had discovered to his cost: his siege had broken up within weeks. Stephen clearly did not wish to attempt a second assault. The King is known to have attended a legatine council meeting in London in spring the following year, and around the same time returned to Oxford to consolidate his authority in the region. Stephen attempted a counter attack, but was roundly beaten at the Battle of Wilton the following year. Oxford, though, remained in the king's possession with William de Chesney as constable; in 1155, the sheriff, Henry de Oxford, was granted £7 to assist with the rebuilding of Oxford, following its "wasting by Stephen's army" 13 years earlier.

Matilda made her way to Devizes Castle, where she was to spend the rest of her campaign in England, and young Henry—whose role was to provide "some small measure of male legitimacy to his mother's struggle", suggested Martin Aurell—spent the next few months in Bristol Castle before returning to his father in France. Many of those that had lost lands in the regions held by the king travelled west to take up patronage from Matilda. With the end of the siege of Oxford, says Stringer, the military situation became generally static, "and would remain thus until the end of the war", which was to continue, in Cronne's words, as a "chess-like war of castle sieges". (Note: Although it was a war of sieges, these took different forms. Sometimes castles and towns were besieged as one (such as Bristol in 1138 and Wallingford the following year), although more often than not the castle resisted after the town had fallen, as at Winchester and Lincoln in 1141 and Oxford the following year. The reason castles were of such continuous significance, says Davis, was that both sides were short of money: since neither Stephen nor Matilda possessed the resources with to which to conquer and then hold great swathes of land, they had to focus their efforts towards controlling regional political loci. According to Keith Stringer, "the technology of defence had outstripped that of attack", and so besiegers often found themselves bogged down in fighting a small war at every town they beset.) Both sides were, and continued to be, crippled by a combination of the massive cost of warfare and inefficient methods of raising revenue. (Note: The Norman methods of taxation, still in use in the late 12th century have been described by W. L. Warren as "the greatest failure of Norman government".) Matilda left England in 1148; Stephen died in 1154, and, under the terms of the Treaty of Wallingford signed the previous year, Henry, Duke of Normandy, ascended the English throne as King Henry II.
