= Wade Reavis =

American politician

Wade Reavis was an American politician.

Reavis was born in Hamptonville, North Carolina, on December 20, 1876, to parents Charles S. and Esther L. Reavis. He graduated from East Bend High School in East Bend, then enrolled at Yadkinville Normal School. Reavis completed a Bachelor of Arts at Wake Forest College in 1898, then obtained a Bachelor of Laws at Georgetown University Law Center. He practiced law and, between 1899 and 1900, served as superintendent of education in Yadkin County. Reavis was first elected to the North Carolina House of Representatives in 1911, as a Republican. He was a Freemason, affiliated with the A. F. and A. M Hickory Lodge.
