= John Reeves =

John Reeves may refer to:

== Sports ==
- John Reeves (baseball), American baseball player
- John Reeves (Australian footballer) (1929–1970), Australian rules footballer
- John Reeves (footballer, born 1963), English football (soccer) player for Fulham and Colchester United
- John Reeves (American football) (born 1975), American football linebacker

== Others ==
- John Reeves (activist) (1752–1829), British judge, public official and conservative activist
- John Reeves (naturalist) (1774–1856), English naturalist
- John Sims Reeves (1821–1900), English operatic, oratorio and ballad tenor vocalist
- John W. Reeves Jr. (1888–1967), U.S. Navy admiral
- John Reeves (composer) (born 1926), Canadian composer, broadcaster, author, recipient of John Drainie Award
- John Reeves (judge) (born 1952), Australian politician, lawyer and judge
- John M. Reeves, after whom the Reeves Peninsula in Antarctica is named

== See also ==
- John Reaves (1950–2017), American football player
- John Reeve (disambiguation)
