= James Reeves (physician) =

American physician and public health advocate (1829–1896)

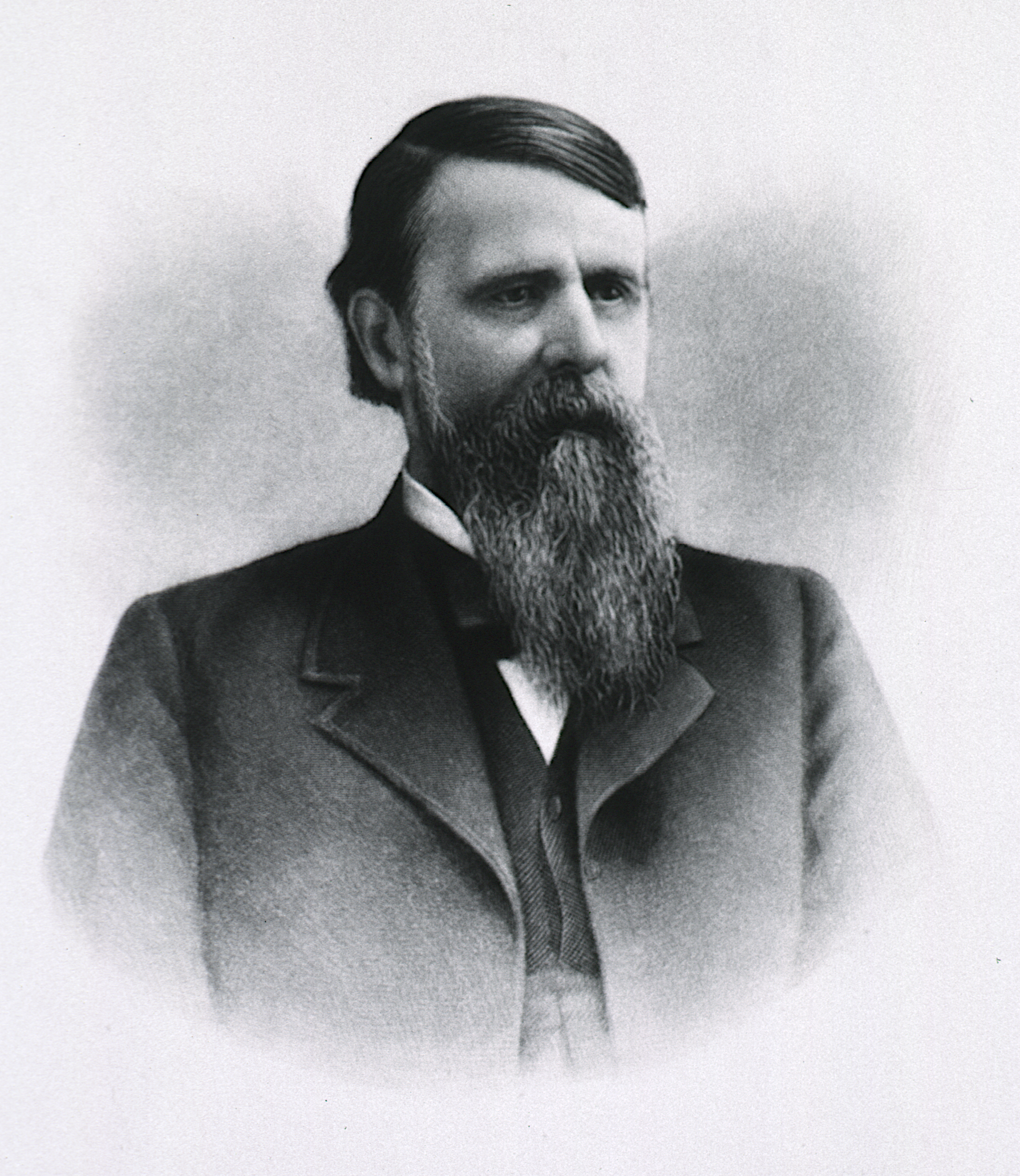
James E. Reeves circa 1885

James Edmund Reeves (April 5, 1829 – January 4, 1896) was a West Virginia physician and one of the leaders of the American public health movement in the nineteenth century. Reeves was the brother of Ann Reeves Jarvis, the woman who inspired the Mother's Day holiday in the United States.

== Biography ==
Reeves was born in Amissville, Virginia on April 5, 1829 to Josiah Washington and Nancy Kemper Reeves. His initial education was mostly self-taught, with two years of medical apprenticeship and one session of medical college at Hampden Sidney (sic) in Richmond before he entered practice in Philippi, Virginia, in 1851.

Reeves eventually received his MD degree from the University of Pennsylvania Medical College in 1860 and settled in Fairmont, Virginia, with his wife and four children. During the Civil War he did not take sides, but assisted his sister Ann with her Mothers Work Clubs. After the War he helped form a state medical society for West Virginia.

Reeves moved to Wheeling, West Virginia in 1868 where he developed an interest in public health. He was named Wheeling's first permanent health officer in 1869. He was a founding member of the American Public Health Association in 1872. In 1881 he drafted the West Virginia Board of Health Act and became the new Board's first Secretary. In 1882 he had Frank Dent arrested for practicing medicine without a license, which led to the landmark 1889 U.S. Supreme Court ruling in Dent v. West Virginia. Reeves was President of the Medical Society of West Virginia in 1882 and President of the American Public Health Association in 1885. In 1888 he moved to Chattanooga, Tennessee where he developed a career as a nationally known microscopic pathologist. He died of liver cancer on January 4, 1896.

== Publications ==
- A practical treatise on enteric fever: its diagnosis and treatment : being an analysis of one hundred and thirty consecutive cases, derived from private practice, and embracing a partial history of the disease in Virginia (1859)
- The physical and medical topography, including vital, manufacturing and other statistics, of the city of Wheeling (1870)
- Annual address by the president of the Medical Society of the State of West Virginia (1882)
- A hand-book of medical microscopy for students and general practitioners : including chapters on bacteriology, neoplasms, and urinary examinations (1894)

== Bibliography ==
- Harris Jr., John M. (2019). Professionalizing medicine : James Reeves and the choices that shaped American health care. Jefferson: McFarland. ISBN 978-1-4766-7636-4.
- Mohr, James C (2013). Licensed to practice : the Supreme Court defines the American medical profession. Baltimore: The Johns Hopkins University Press. ISBN 978-1-4214-1142-2.
- Harris Jr., John M. (2016). "Medical Ethics, Methodism, and a Nineteenth-Century West Virginian's Battles with Quackery". West Virginia History. 10 (Spring): 27–44. doi:10.1353/wvh.2016.0010. S2CID 159505962.
- Harris Jr., John M. (2015). "James Edmund Reeves (1829-1896) and the contentious 19th century battle for medical professionalism in the United States". Journal of Medical Biography. 23 (3): 158–169. doi:10.1177/0967772014532042. PMID 24802355. S2CID 206608887.
- Harris Jr., John M. (2014). "James Edmund Reeves. 1883". American Journal of Public Health. 104 (3): 417. doi:10.2105/AJPH.2013.301739. PMC 3953775. PMID 24432947.
- Kelly, Howard A.; Burrage, Walter L. (1928). Dictionary of American Biography. Boston: Milford House. pp. 1024–1025.
