= Richard Reeve =

English instrument-maker (fl. 1640–1680)

Richard Reeve or Reeves (fl. 1640–1680) was an instrument maker in London in the 17th century. He worked with Christopher Wren and Robert Hooke. His son was also Richard Reeve (fl. 1680).

== Accuracy ==
Reeve's telescopes and microscopes had a wide reputation for accuracy. Hooke worked with him in a technical advisory capacity. As Richard Reeve of Long Acre, his firm was the foremost fashioner of optical instruments between 1641 and 1679 and a "perspective-glass maker to the King".

Reeve was also optician to James Gregory. Samuel Pepys, who purchased a microscope from him in August 1664, called him "the best he knows in England, and he makes the best in the world." Five pounds 10 shillings was "a great price", but Reeve threw in a Scotoscope (camera obscura), "and a curious curiosity it is to [see] objects in a dark room with."

== Family ==
Reeve's son was also an instrument maker, known as Richard Reeve Jr (fl. 1680). However, the man referred to as "Young" Reeve in Pepys' entry of 23 March 1659/60, would be the older Richard's son John, who took over the family business in 1679 and ran it until about 1710.

The older Richard was arrested in 1664 for murdering his wife, but secured a royal pardon, probably at great cost.
