= Reve =

Reve, Reves, Revé, or Rêve may refer to:

== People ==
- Alexis Revé (born 1972), Cuban footballer
- Gerard Reve (1923–2006), Dutch writer
- Emery Reves (1904–1981), Hungarian-born writer, publisher, literary agent and advocate of world federalism
- Ernesto Revé (born 1992), Cuban triple jumper
- Karel van het Reve (1921–1999), Dutch writer, translator and literary historian teaching and writing on Russian literature
- Odalis Revé (born 1970), Cuban judoka
- Thomas le Reve (died 1394), Irish bishop and Lord Chancellor of Ireland
- Torger Reve (born 1949), Norwegian economist
- Wendy Russell Reves (1916–2007), an American philanthropist, socialite, and former fashion model
- Rêve (singer), a Canadian singer-songwriter

== Miscellaneous ==
- Rêves (album), 2009 posthumous album by Grégory Lemarchal
- Revés/Yo Soy, 1999 album by Café Tacuba
- Rêve: the Dream Ouroboros, French dreamlike fantasy role-playing game created by Denis Gerfaud and edited in English by Malcontent Games
- Reve's puzzle, optimal solution of the Tower of Hanoi, a mathematical game or puzzle
- Reo (deity), sometimes rendered as Reve in Latin inscriptions, a Lusitanian-Gallaecian deity

== See also ==
- Le Rêve (disambiguation), title of several cultural works
- Reeve, the surname of many people
- Reeves, the surname of many people
