= Reeve (surname) =

Reeve is an English surname originally meaning officer or steward. derived from the Old English ge refa. spelling variations, including Reeve, Reve, Reave, Reaves, Reeves and others. Some notable persons with the surname include:

- Ada Reeve (1874–1966), English actress. Mother of Goodie Reeve.
- Alan Reeve (born 1948), English murderer
- Arthur B. Reeve (1880–1936), American author
- Arthur Stretton Reeve (1907–1981), Bishop of Lichfield
- Arthur W.V. Reeve (1913 – c. 1994), Scouting New Zealand notable, awardee of the Bronze Wolf in 1979
- Birdie Reeve Kay (1907–1996), American champion typist
- C. D. C. Reeve (born 1948), American philosopher
- Charlie Reeve, American psychologist
- Cheryl Reeve, American basketball head coach
- Chris Reeve (born 1953), American knife maker
- Christopher Reeve (1952–2004), American actor and activist
- Clara Reeve (1729–1807), English novelist
- Connie Reeve (1924-2023), makeup artist, known for Superman
- Dana Reeve (1961–2006), American actress, singer and activist
- Dermot Reeve (born 1963), former English cricketer
- Donald Reeve (1923–1994), British civil engineer
- Edward Reeve (1822–1889), Australian art patron and playwright
- Ella Reeve Bloor (1862–1951), American labor organizer and activist
- Elle Reeve, American correspondent
- F.D. Reeve (1928–2013), American poet
- Fred Reeve, English footballer
- Geoffrey Reeve (1932–2010), British movie director and producer
- Goodie Reeve (1897–1978), English-born Australian radio host, actress, songwriter and musician. Daughter of Ada Reeve.
- Henry Reeve (journalist) (1813–1895), English journalist
- Henry Reeve (soldier) (1850–1876), Brigadier General in Cuba's 'Ejército Libertador'
- Herbert Reeve (1868–1956), English clergyman and missionary
- Isaac Van Duzen Reeve (1813–1890), soldier in the United States Army
- James H. Reeve, UK broadcaster, journalist, raconteur and radio phone-in host
- Jill Reeve (born 1969), former American field hockey defender
- Joan Reeve (died 1929), alias of Grace Oakeshott, British activist for women's rights
- Joel Reeve (1901–1988), pseudonym of American author William Robert Cox
- John Reeve (religious leader) (1608–1658), English prophet and author
- John Reeve (businessman), British CEO of Willis Group Holdings
- John Reeve Lavell (1857–1925), lawyer and political figure in Ontario
- John N. Reeve, American microbiologist
- Ken Reeve, English footballer
- Lovell Augustus Reeve (1814–1865), malacologist
- Martin Reeve, British actor
- Philip Reeve (born 1966), British author and illustrator
- Robert Campbell Reeve (1902–1980), founder of Reeve Aleutian Airlines
- Simon Reeve (disambiguation)
- Sue Reeve (born 1951), English long jumper
- Tapping Reeve (1744–1823), American lawyer and law educator
- Ted Reeve (1902–1983), multi-sport Canadian athlete and sports journalist
- Thomas Reeve (1673–1737), British justice
- Trevor Reeve (1915–1993), British barrister and judge
- William Reeve (disambiguation)
- Wybert Reeve (1831–1906), English actor and stage manager with a significant career in Australia

== See also ==
- Reeve (disambiguation)
- Reeves (surname)
