= Le Rêve =

Le Rêve (French: The Dream) may refer to:

== Paintings ==
- Le Rêve (Detaille), an 1888 painting by Édouard Detaille
- Le Rêve (Matisse), a 1935 painting by Henri Matisse
- Le Rêve (Picasso), a 1932 painting by Pablo Picasso
- The Dream (Rousseau painting), a 1910 painting by Henri Rousseau
- Le Rêve (Chagall), a 1927 painting by Marc Chagall

== Other ==
- Le Rêve (novel), an 1888 novel by Émile Zola
- Le Rêve (opera), an 1891 opera by Alfred Bruneau, libretto by Émile Zola, based on his novel
- "En ferment les yeux (le rêve)", an aria sung by Le Chevalier des Grieux in the Second Act of Jules Massenet's 1884 opera Manon
- Le Rêve (show), first production to open at the Wynn Las Vegas resort
- Le Rêve (Dubai), a residential tower in Dubai

== See also ==
- Reve (disambiguation)
- Rêves (disambiguation)
- Reeve (disambiguation)
- Reeves (disambiguation)
- The Dream
