= Garden District =

The Garden District can refer to:

== Place names ==
Canada

- Garden District, Toronto

United States

by state then city

- Alexandria Garden District, Alexandria, Louisiana
- Garden District (Montgomery, Alabama), listed on the NRHP in Alabama
- Garden District, DeLand, Florida
- Garden District, Baton Rouge, Louisiana
- Garden District, New Orleans, Louisiana

== Theatre ==
- Garden District, (1958) the title of a double-bill of one-act plays by Tennessee Williams, set in New Orleans' Garden District, Suddenly Last Summer and Something Unspoken
