= Reeves House =

Reeves House may refer to:

- Reeves-Melson House, Bonnerdale, AR, listed on the NRHP in Arkansas
- W. F. Reeves House, Marshall, AR, listed on the NRHP in Arkansas
- Reeves House (Siloam Springs, Arkansas), listed on the NRHP in Arkansas
- Reeves House (Highland Park, California), listed as a Los Angeles Historic-Cultural Monument
- Jabez Reeves Farmstead, Rushville, IN, listed on the NRHP in Indiana
- Jane Ross Reeves Octagon House, Shirley, IN, listed on the NRHP in Indiana
- Reeves Farmstead Historic District, LeMars, IA, listed on the NRHP in Iowa
- W. L. Reeves House, Elkton, KY, listed on the NRHP in Kentucky
- Reiley-Reeves House, Baton Rouge, LA, listed on the NRHP in Louisiana
- Reeves-Iszard-Godfey House, Upper Township, NJ, listed on the NRHP in New Jersey
- Jeremiah Reeves House and Carriage House, Dover, OH, listed on the NRHP in Ohio
- Reeves-Womack House, Caldwell, TX, listed on the NRHP in Texas
- Sylvester H. Reeves House, Beaver, UT, listed on the NRHP in Utah
- John C. Reeves House, Wellsburg, WV, listed on the NRHP in West Virginia
