= William Reeves =

William, Bill or Billy Reeves may refer to:

- William Reeves (animator) (born 1959), Canadian animator and technical director
- William Reeves (bishop) (1815–1892), Church of Ireland bishop and antiquarian
- William Reeves (Australian cricketer) (1881–1962), Australian cricketer
- William Reeves (New Zealand cricketer) (1857–1932), New Zealand cricketer
- William Reeves (finance) (born 1963/64), co-founder of BlueCrest Capital Management
- William Reeves (journalist) (1825–1891), father of William Pember Reeves
- William Reeves (publisher) (1853–1937), publisher and bookseller
- Bill Reeves (1875–1944), English cricketer
- Bill Reeves (basketball) (1904–1983), American professional basketball player
- Bill Reeves (footballer) (1888–1940), Australian rules footballer
- Billy Reeves (born 1965), British songwriter and broadcaster
- Billy Reeves (footballer) (born 1996), English soccer player
- William Conrad Reeves (1838–1902), lawyer, academic and legal figure on the island of Barbados
- William Pember Reeves (1857–1932), New Zealand statesman, historian and poet

== See also ==
- William Reeve (disambiguation)
