= Reiley-Reeves House =

- U.S. National Register of Historic Places
- U.S. Historic district – Contributing property
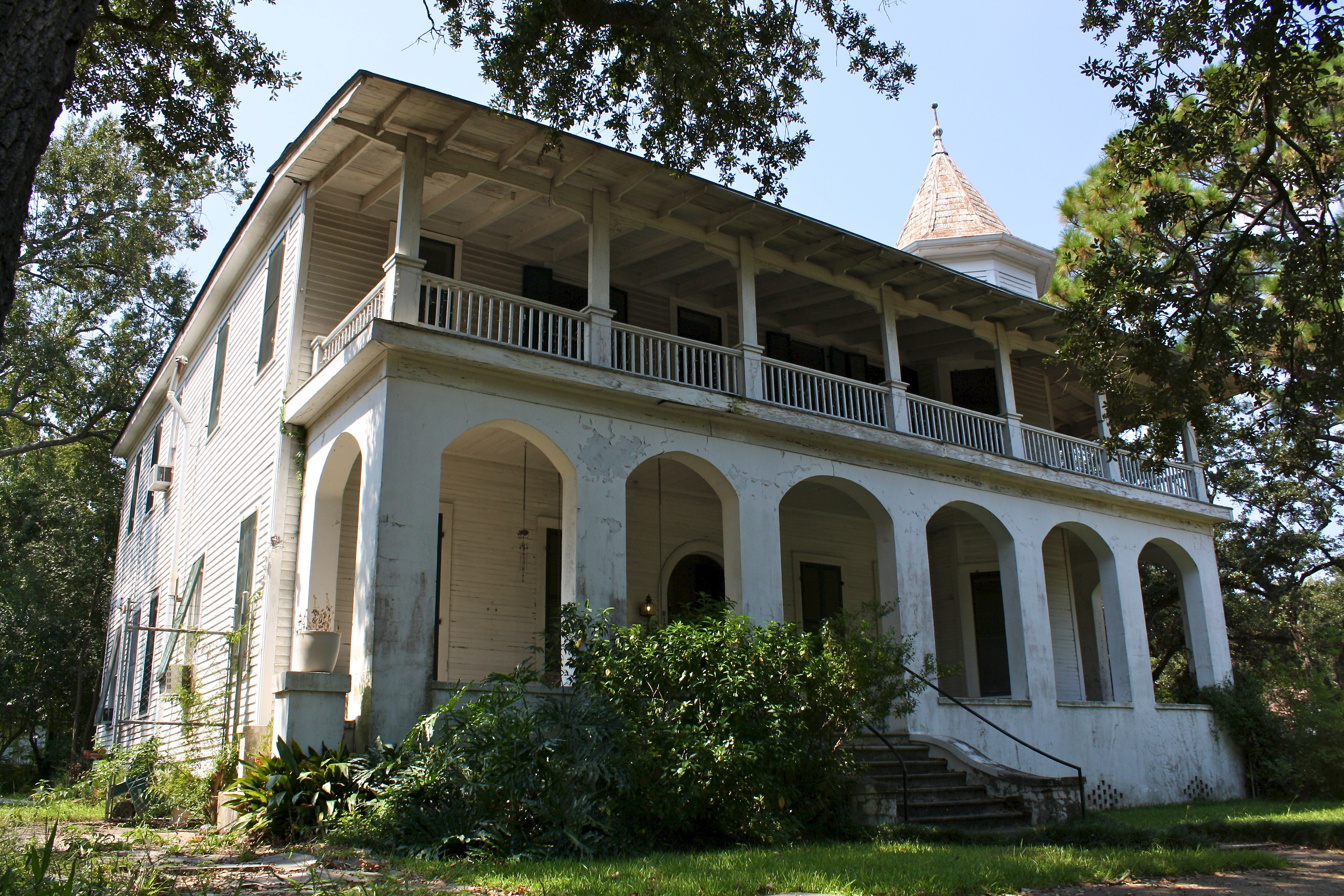

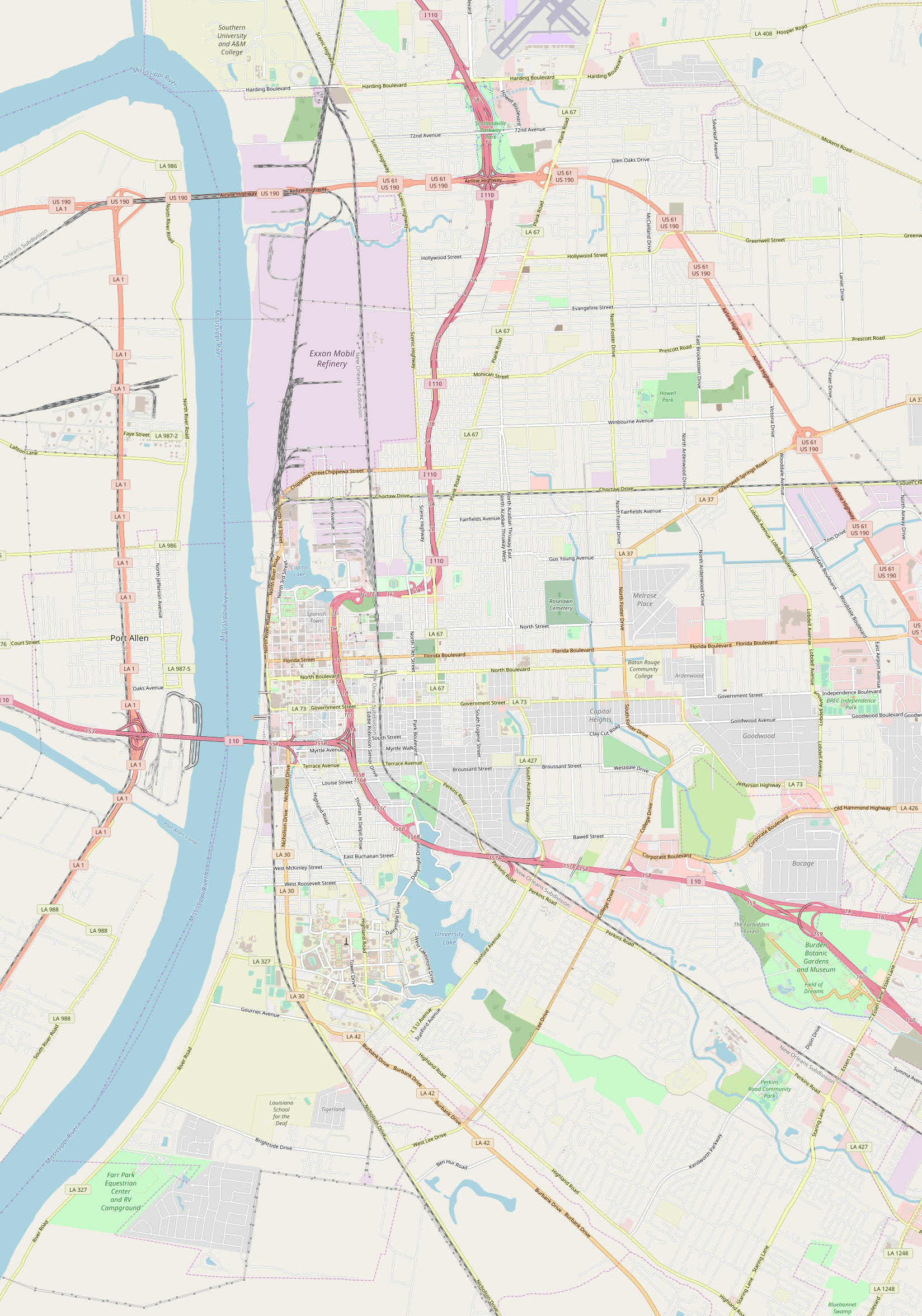
- Location within Baton Rouge
- Location: 810 Park Boulevard, Baton Rouge, Louisiana
- Coordinates: 30°26′27″N 91°10′09″W
- Area: 0.25 acres (0.10 ha)
- Built: c.1910-11
- Built by: Edward Ross, W.F. Bangs
- Architectural style: Queen Anne
- Part of: Roseland Terrace Historic District (ID82002770)
- NRHP reference No.: 79001060

Significant dates
- Added to NRHP: May 24, 1979
- Designated CP: March 11, 1982

The Reiley-Reeves House is a historic house located in the Garden District of Baton Rouge, Louisiana, at 810 Park Avenue.

It was constructed in c.1910-11 for planter George Junkin Reiley in the Queen Anne Revival style and it is one of the few homes from early 1900s still standing in the city, and it's the only remaining home in the city with a Queen Anne style turret and steeple.

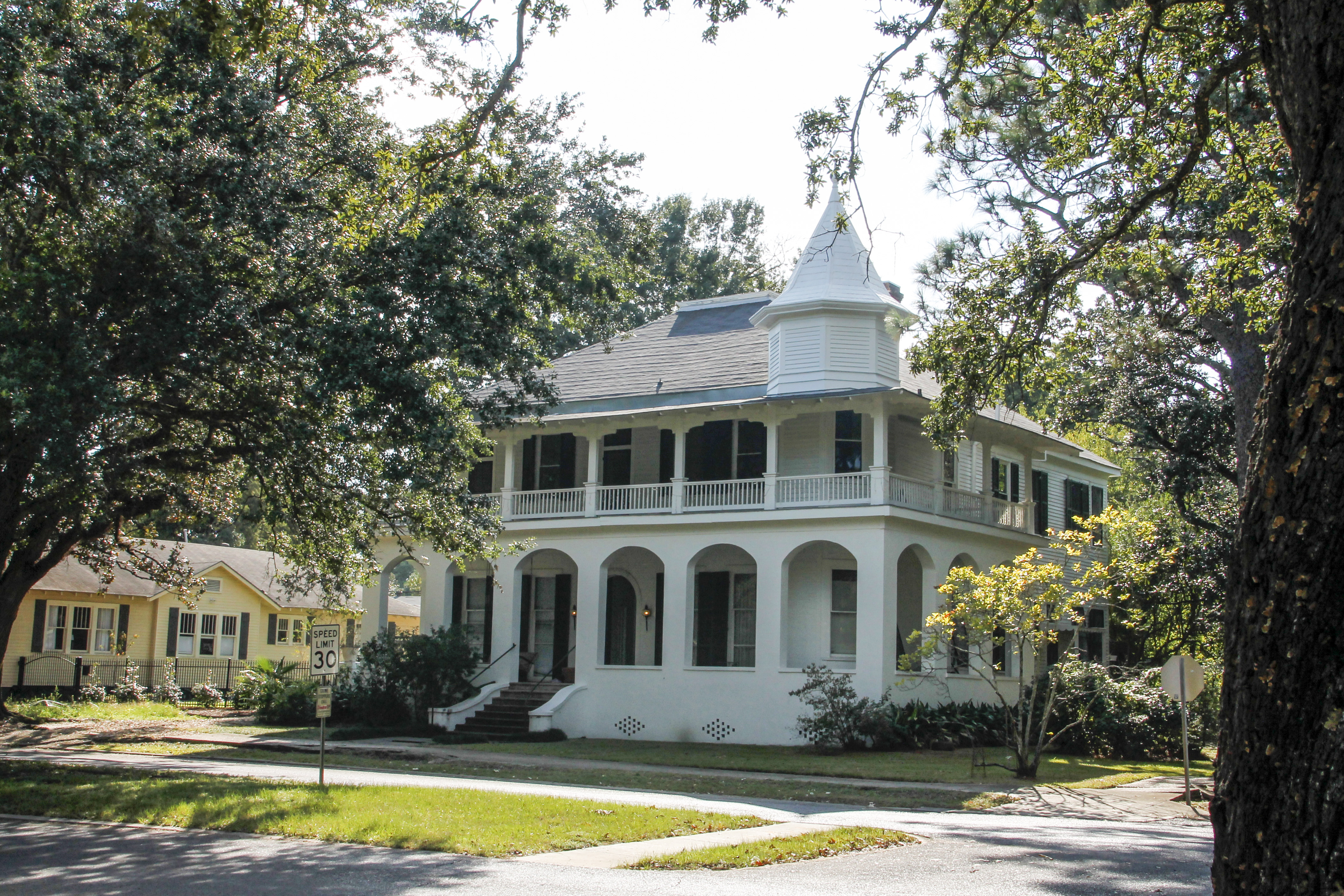
Reiley-Reeves House in Baton Rouge, LA from across Park Ave

The house was listed on the National Register of Historic Places on May 24, 1979. It was also added as a contributing resource to the Roseland Terrace Historic District at the time of its creation on March 11, 1982.

== See also ==
- National Register of Historic Places listings in East Baton Rouge Parish, Louisiana
