= Reeves House (Siloam Springs, Arkansas) =

Historic house in Arkansas, United States

- U.S. National Register of Historic Places
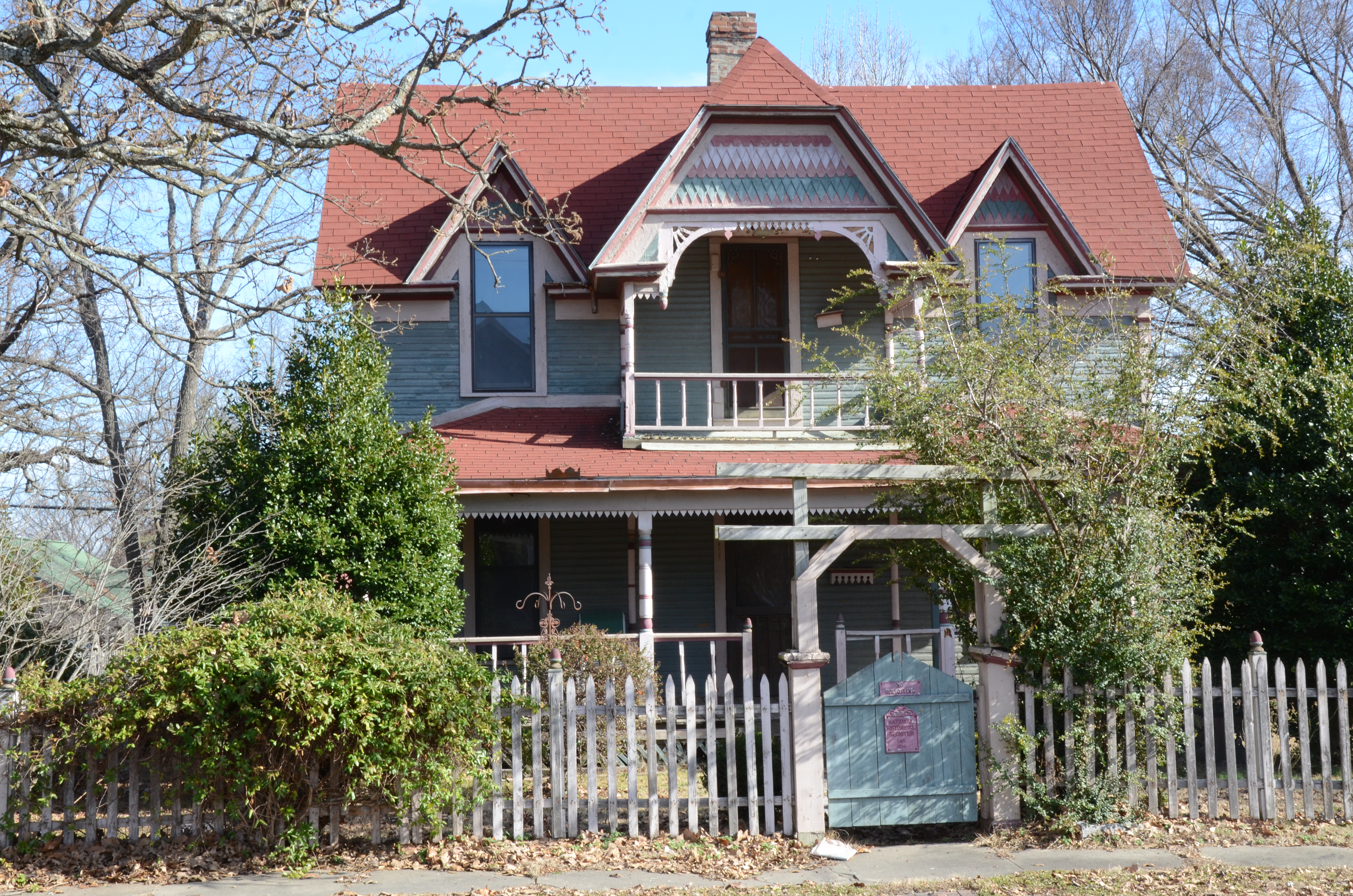

- Location within Arkansas Location within the United States
- Location: 321 S. Wright St., Siloam Springs, Arkansas
- Coordinates: 36°10′58″N 94°32′30″W
- Area: less than one acre
- Built: 1895
- Architectural style: Queen Anne
- MPS: Benton County MRA
- NRHP reference No.: 95001091
- Added to NRHP: September 7, 1995

The Reeves House is a historic house at 321 South Wright Street in Siloam Springs, Arkansas. It is a two-story wood-frame structure, with a side gable roof, wood clapboards and shingling, and a stone and concrete foundation. Its front facade is dominated by a central projecting clipped-gable section, whose gable is partially finished in diamond-cut wood shingles, and which shelters a second story porch over a broader first-story porch. Both porches have jigsawn decorative woodwork and turned posts. The house, built in 1895, is one of the finest high-style Queen Anne Victorians in the city.

The house was listed on the National Register of Historic Places in 1995.

== See also ==
- National Register of Historic Places listings in Benton County, Arkansas
