= Garden District, Baton Rouge, Louisiana =

The Garden District is a residential neighborhood located in Baton Rouge's Mid-City area where Park Boulevard intersects Government Street. The Garden District is an established historic area with many upscale homes and an active civic association .

The Garden District is actually a conglomerate of three historic districts as defined by the Louisiana National Register of Historic Places. They are Roseland Terrace, Drehr Place, and Kleinert Terrace.

== Roseland Terrace Historic District ==
- Roseland Terrace Historic District
- U.S. National Register of Historic Places
- U.S. Historic district
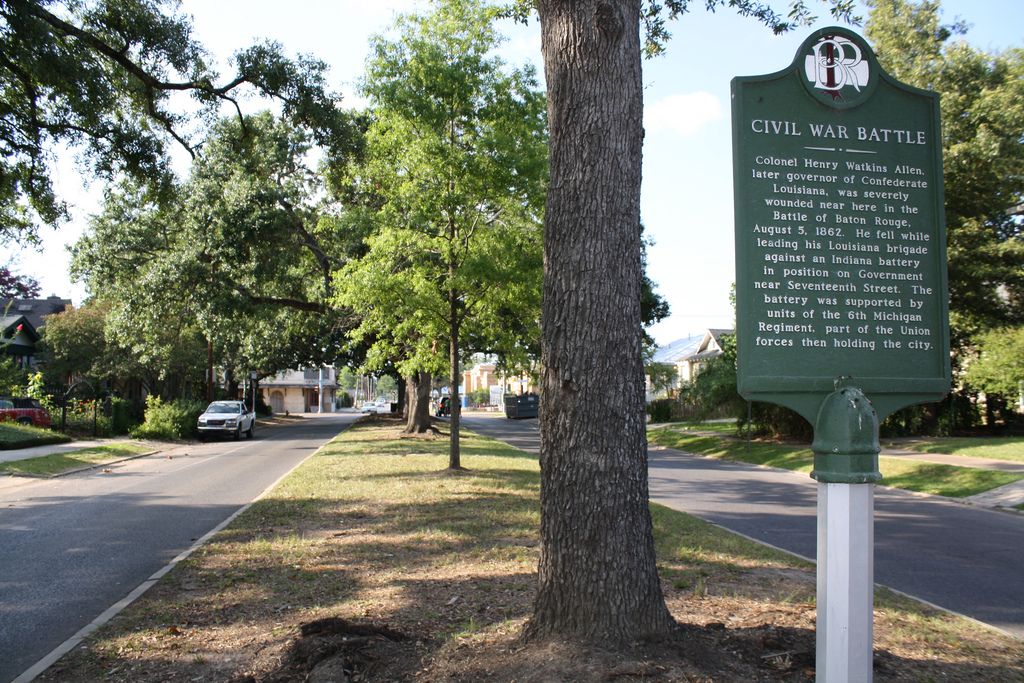

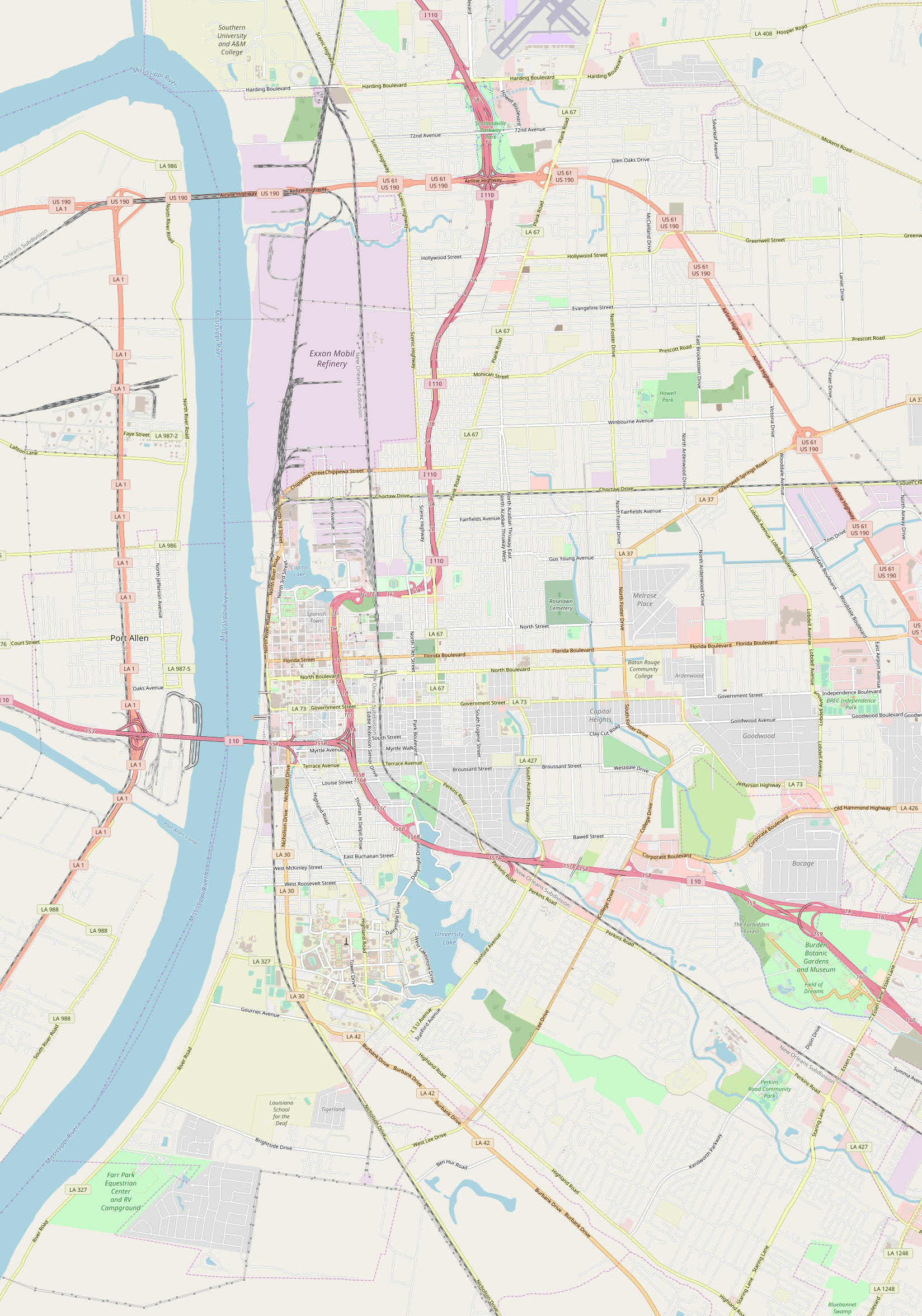
- Location within Baton Rouge

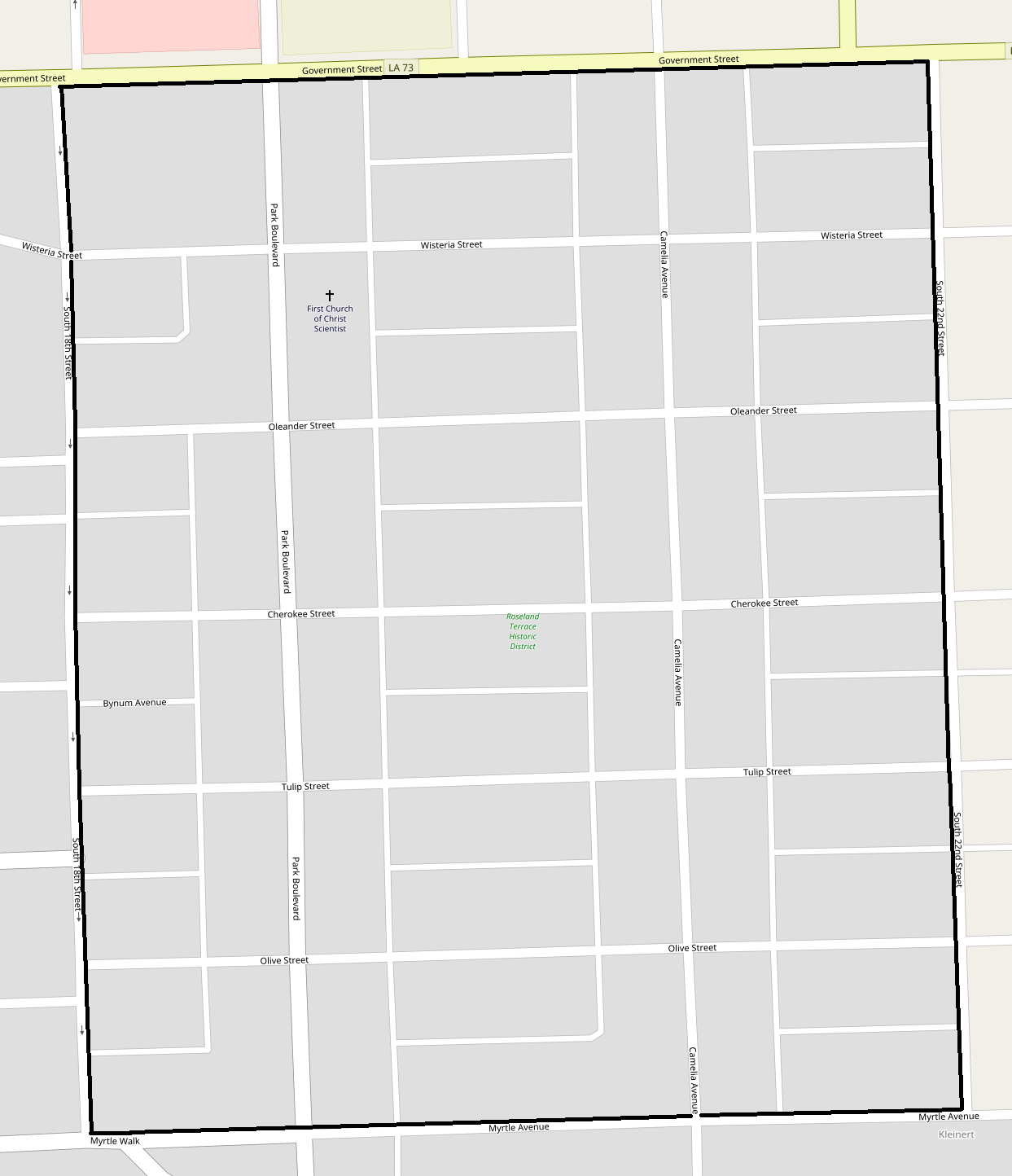
- Location: Bounded by Government Street, South 18th Street, Myrtle Avenue, and South 22nd Street, Baton Rouge, Louisiana
- Coordinates: 30°26′28″N 91°10′04″W
- Area: 65 acres (26 ha)
- Built: 1911
- Architectural style: Bungalow/craftsman, Queen Anne
- NRHP reference No.: 82002770
- Added to NRHP: March 11, 1982

Roseland Terrace is bounded by Government, 18th, Myrtle, and 22nd Streets. Placed on the National Register in 1982, it dates from between 1911 and 1930. The 65 acres (26 ha) area comprises a total of 346 resources, of which 302 are contributing properties. Almost all of the properties are one and two-story residences. The contributing Reiley-Reeves House on Park Avenue is also individually listed on the National Register of Historic Places.

=== History ===
Baton Rouge's first subdivision, Roseland Terrace, was "staked out" in 1911 by the Zadok Realty Company, which had bought the land in 1910 for the sum of $50,000. Prior to this time, the area had been a racetrack and had a decidedly rural character. The fence surrounding the track was covered with wild Cherokee roses. Stories are told that people warned Zadok Realty that the lots would never sell because they were too far out in the country.

A citywide contest was held to name the development, and the winning entry was Roseland Terrace, in honor of the Cherokee roses in the area. To continue this theme, the streets were given flower names. The Zadok Realty Company made a deliberate effort to preserve and enhance the bucolic nature of the area by, for example, planting trees and hiding the telephone poles in the back alleyways. The company's ads boasted that there would be no telephone poles in the streets, but instead that they would be placed in the alleyways behind the residences so that everyone would be spared from "an unsightly conglomeration of poles and wires." Another ad guaranteed prospective buyers freedom from "a century's haphazard, careless growth."

Zadok Realty Company's promotional campaign was obviously successful because after two years they had sold 408 lots at prices ranging from $150 to $500. As can be seen in the extant houses in the district, Roseland Terrace hit its peak of popularity in the late teens and the 1920s. By around 1930 development was virtually complete.

=== Architecture and planning ===
The earliest houses reflect the Queen Anne Colonial Revival influence of the late nineteenth century. These houses have features such as small fluted columns, curved galleries, semioctagonal bays, and relatively elaborate rooflines.

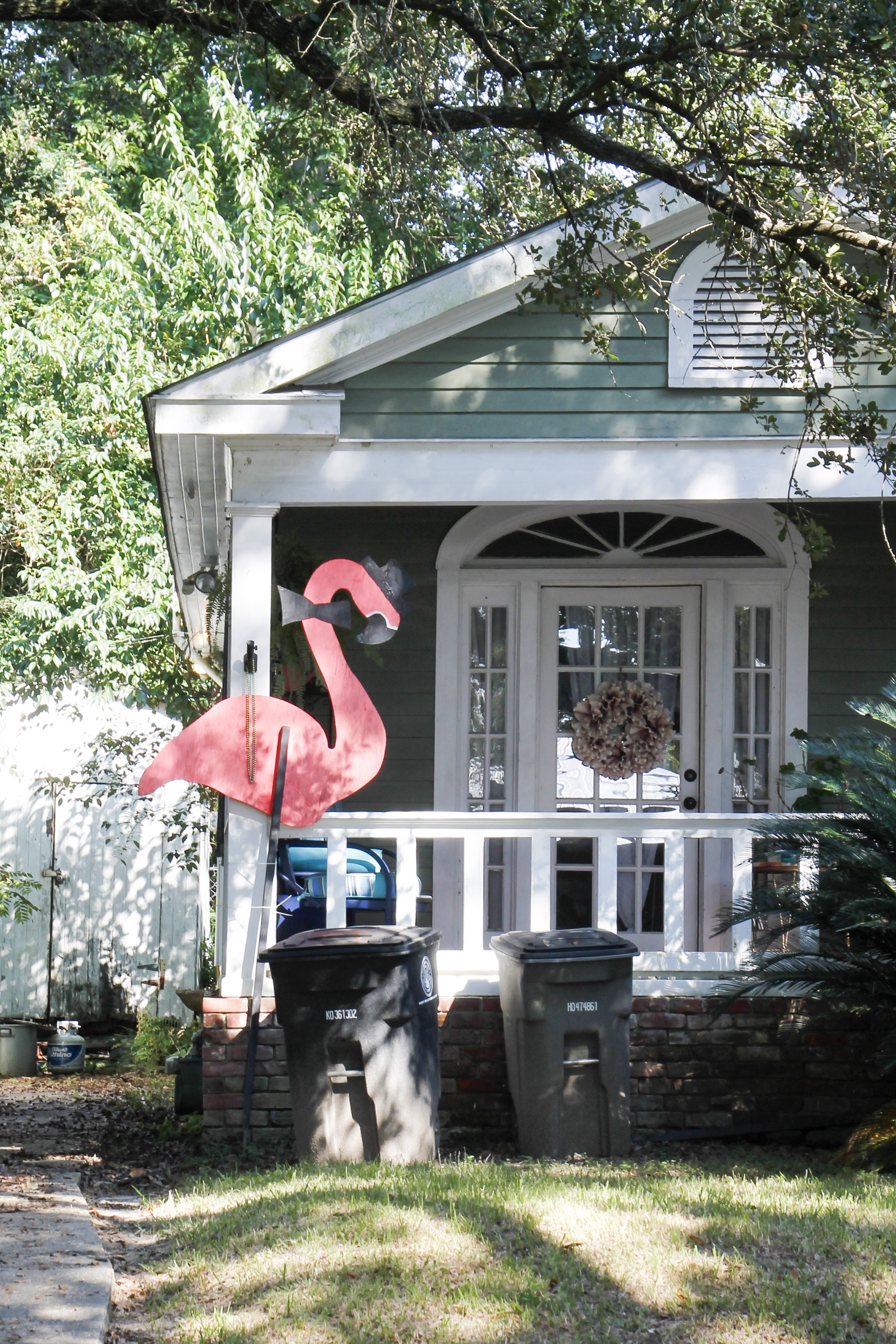
A house sporting a large wooden pink flamingo from a yearly Mardi Gras tradition.

Building in Roseland Terrace underwent a boom between about 1917 and 1930. During this period large numbers of bungalows were constructed. The basic bungalow is a raised, pitched roof, frame structure, 2 rooms wide and 3 rooms deep. The plan is hall less and has wide openings between the public rooms. In all but a few cases there is some sort of front porch. Some have half porches and some have full porches.

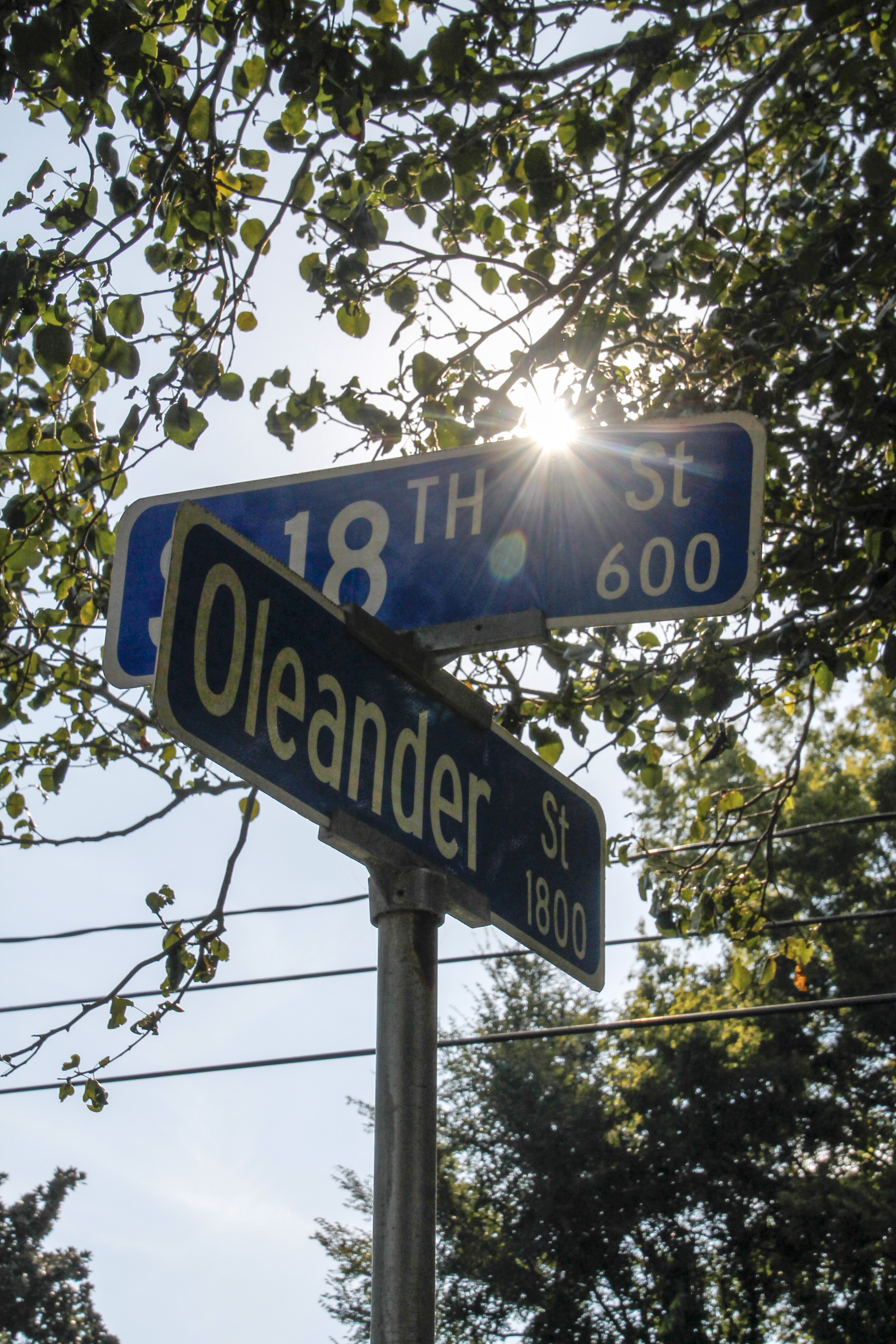
A street sign in the Roseland Terrace Historic District of Baton Rouge, LA.

The Roseland Terrace Historic District is significant in the area of architecture as an example of an early twentieth century residential neighborhood. It retains 88% of its pre-1930 housing stock. Moreover, with close to 300 well developed bungalows in a concentrated area, Roseland Terrace is one of the best preserved early-twentieth century neighborhoods in Louisiana.The overwhelming majority of the structures in the district exemplify the classic bungalow style. These houses are characterized by broad openness, elaborate transfer of weight, massing that hugs the ground, and the bold expression of structural members. Because of this, Roseland Terrace is an excellent representation of the bungalow period, which is an important chapter in the history of American domestic architecture.

Roseland Terrace is also significant in the area of community planning. It was Baton Rouge's first subdivision, and as such it began a trend in suburban growth which has come to characterize the sprawling city. It is also a fine representative example of the type of early twentieth century bedroom suburb which sprang up around major eastern cities in the early twentieth century. These were designed to give working men in the cities a more rural domestic life. Roseland Terrace exemplifies the early twentieth century "garden suburb" with its small lots, liberal planting of trees along streets, and rear alleyways. In addition, it is finer than most because utility poles were deliberately placed (and are still located) along the rear alleyways. Thus, the bucolic atmosphere is preserved and enhanced. Roseland Terrace was Baton Rouge's first planned subdivision as well as its most significant reflection of the ideas and concepts which ultimately led to the Garden City Movement.

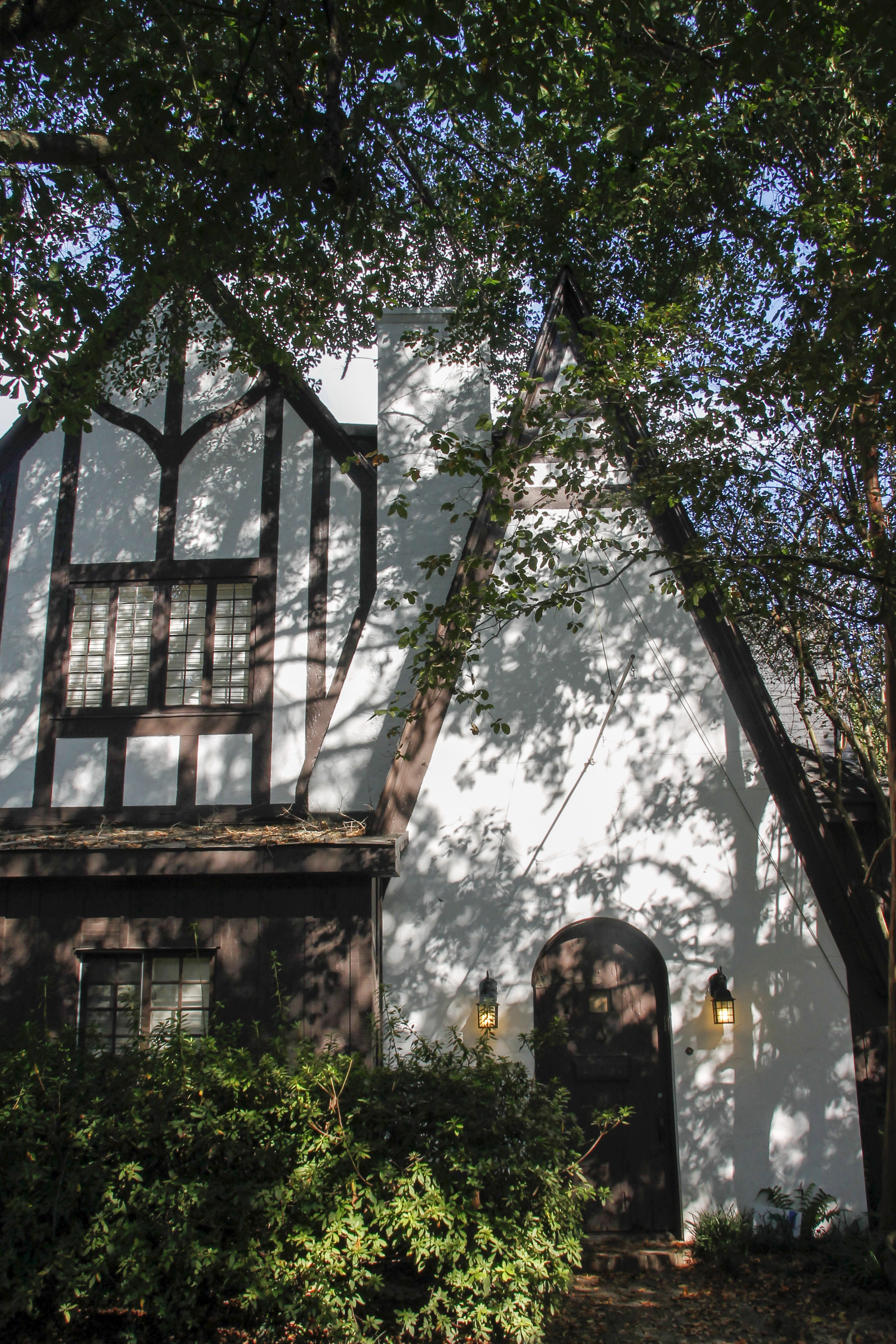
A house designed with the German half-timber style in mind.

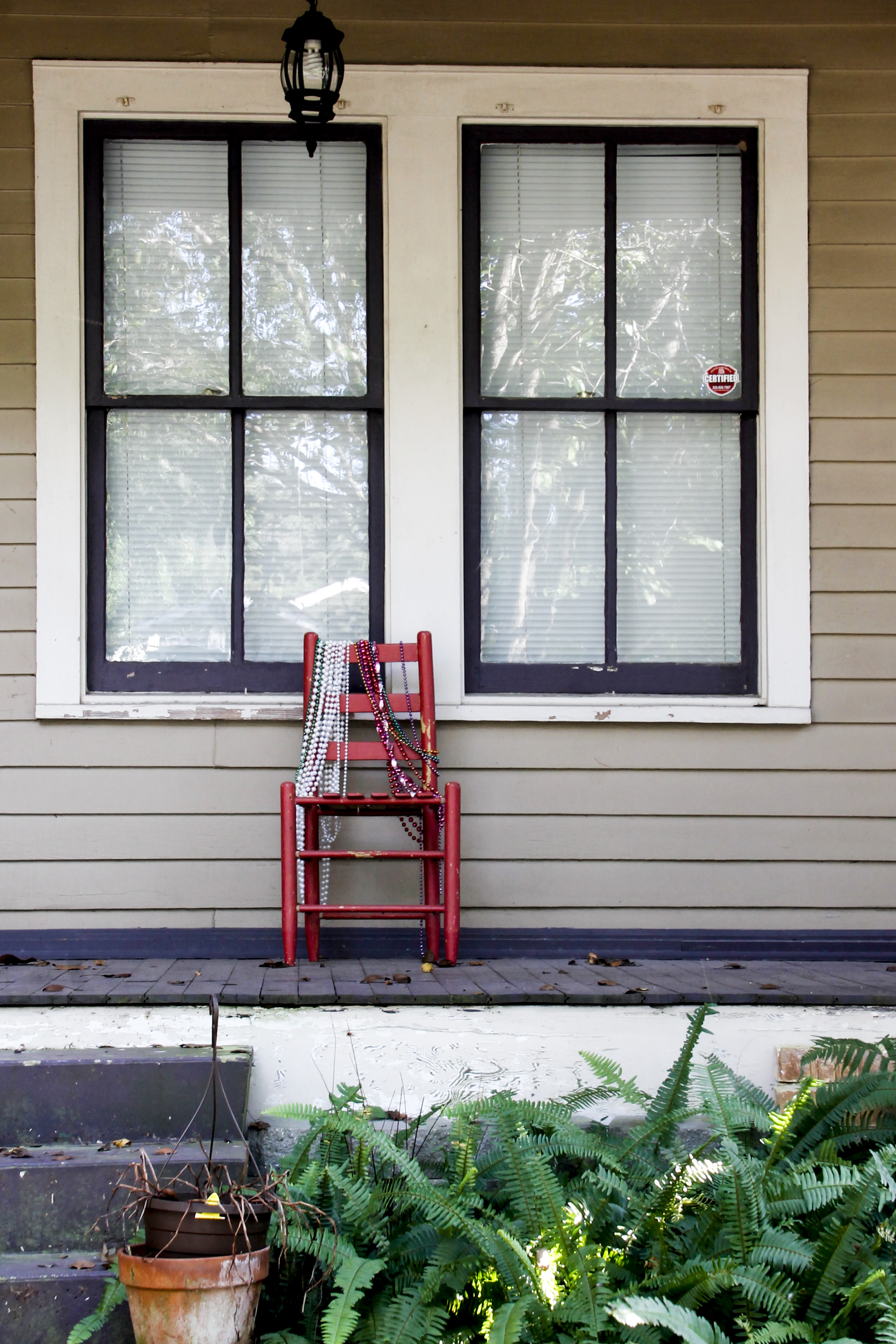
A lonely red chair decorated with Mardi Gras beads sits on a porch.

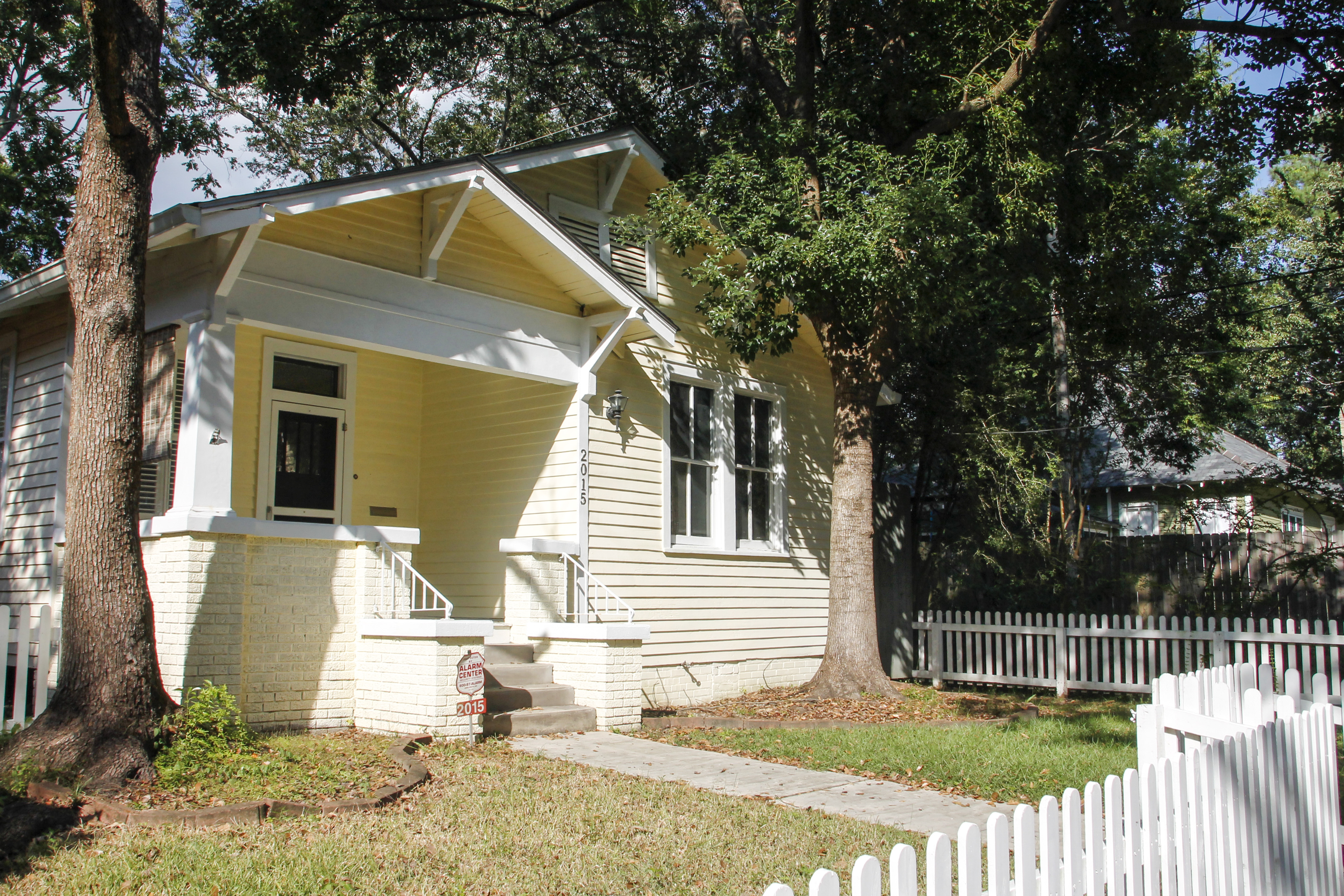
A small yellow house with a white picket fence.

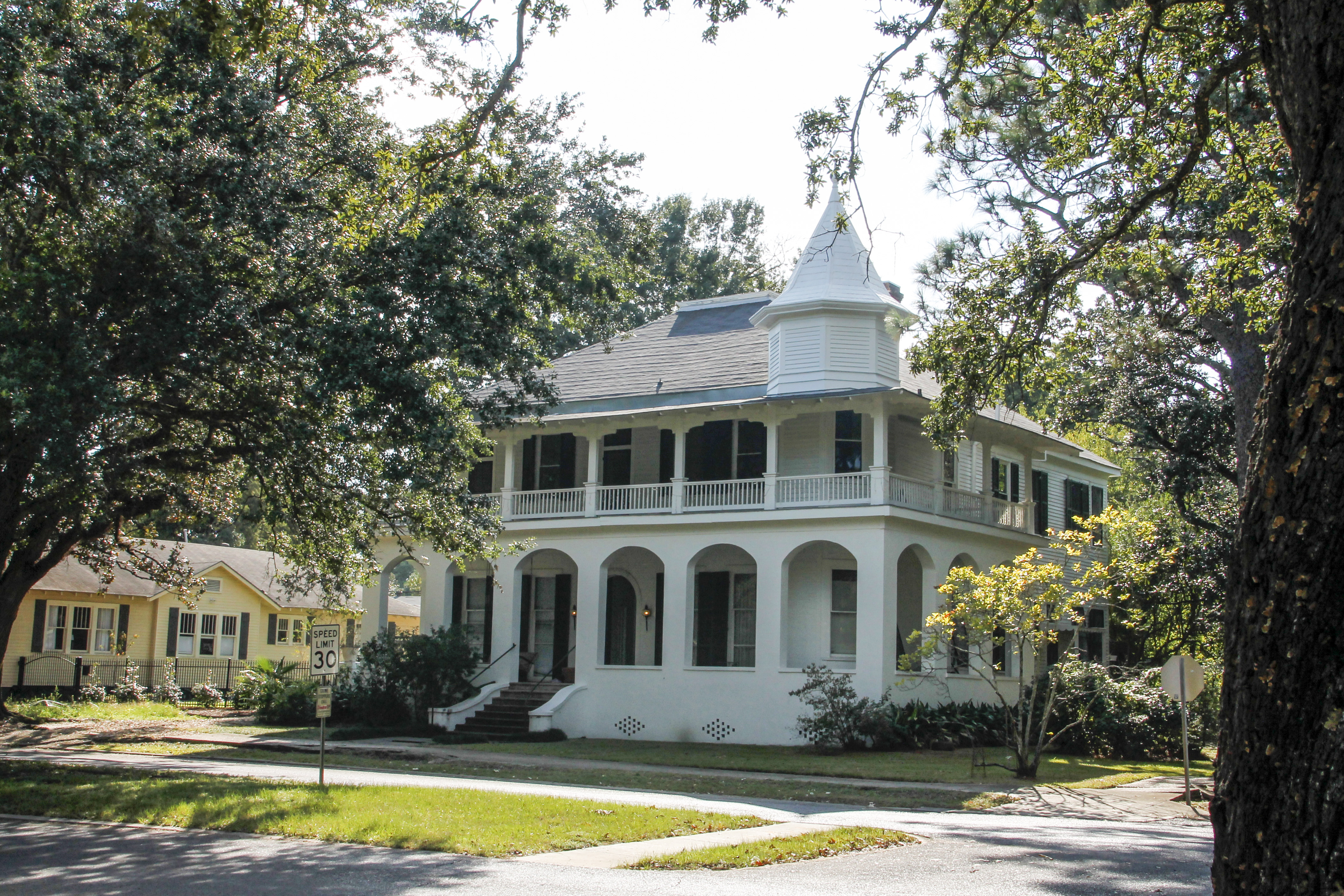
Reiley-Reeves House on Park Avenue

== Drehr Place Historic District ==
- Drehr Place Historic District
- U.S. National Register of Historic Places
- U.S. Historic district
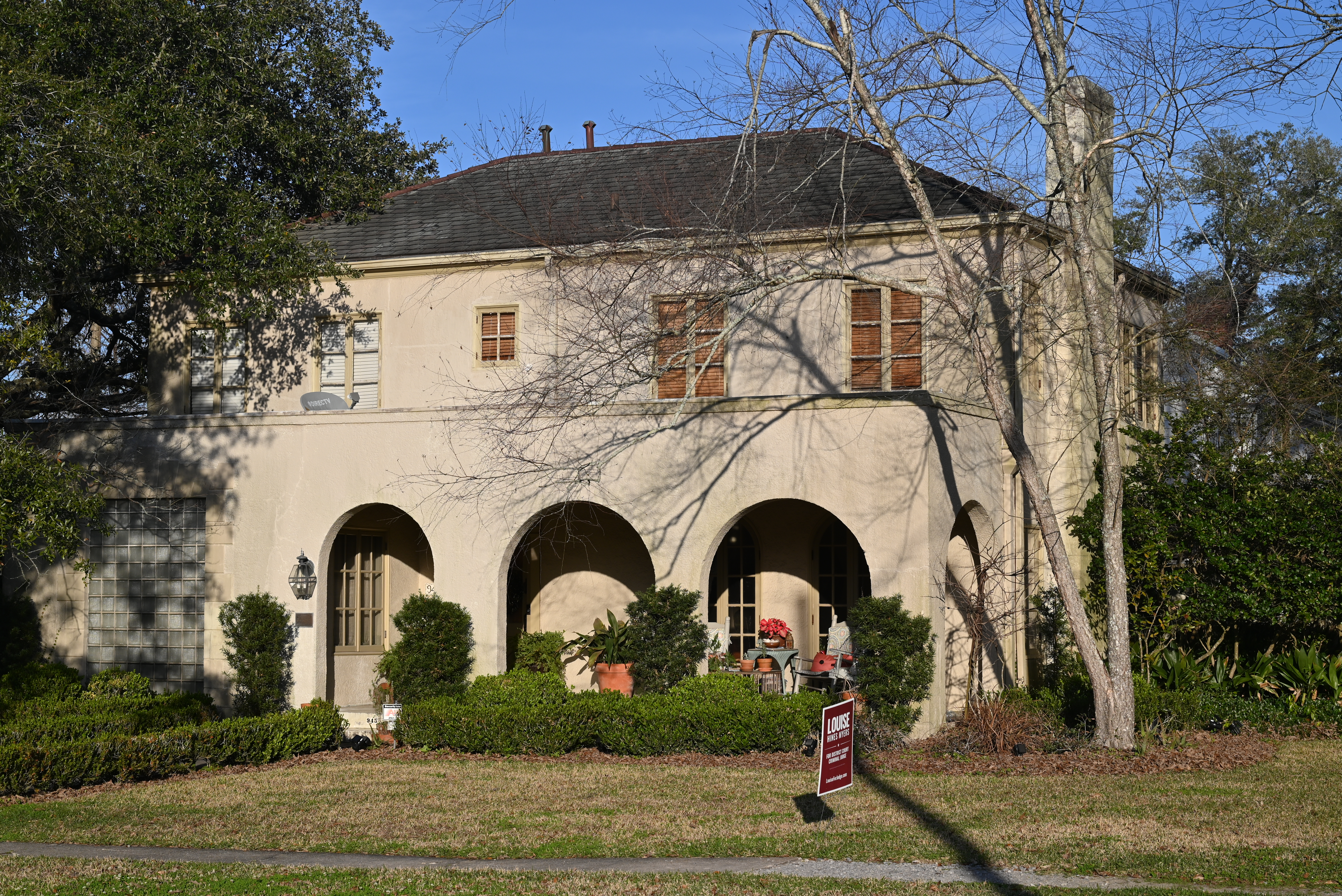

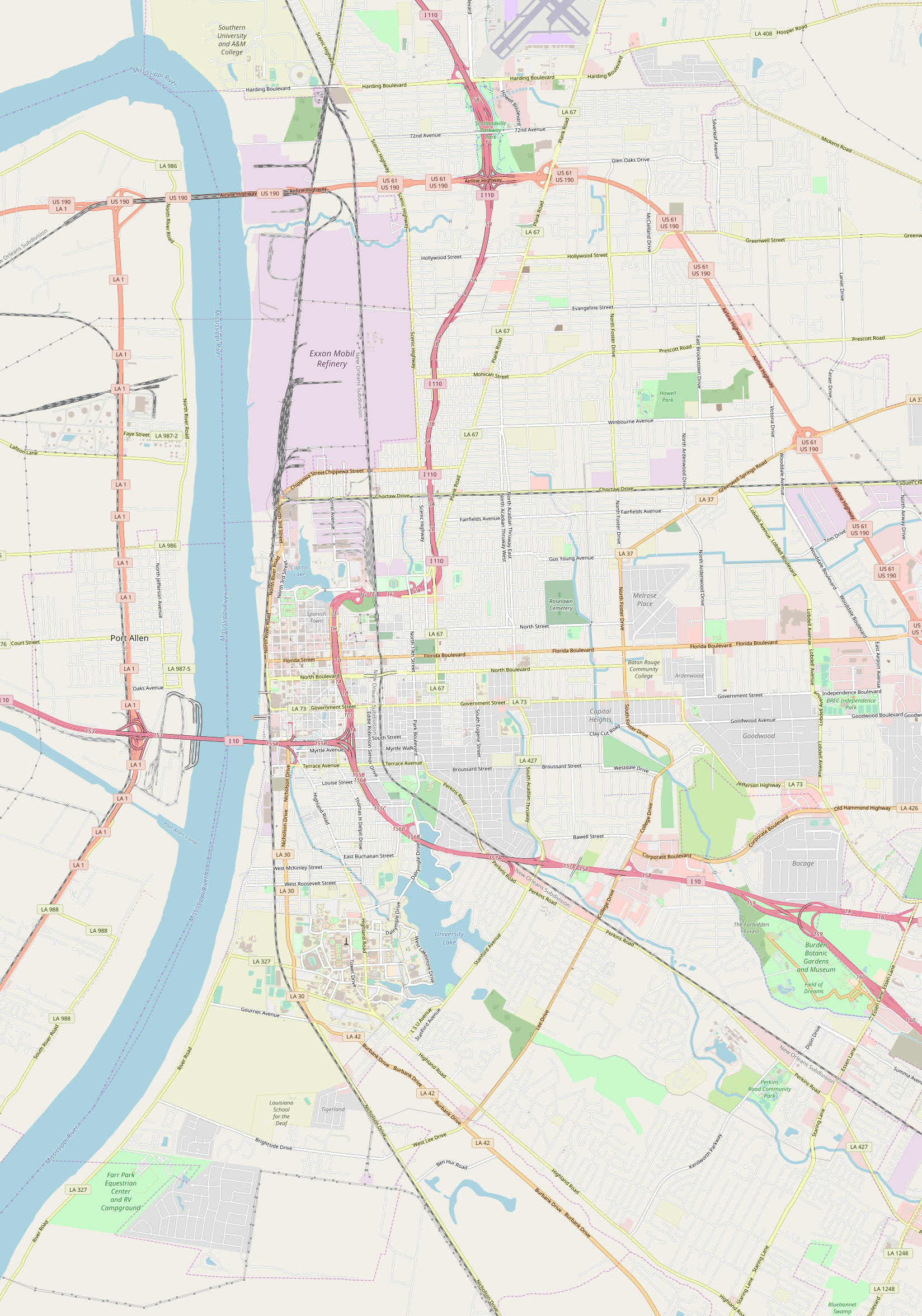
- Location within Baton Rouge

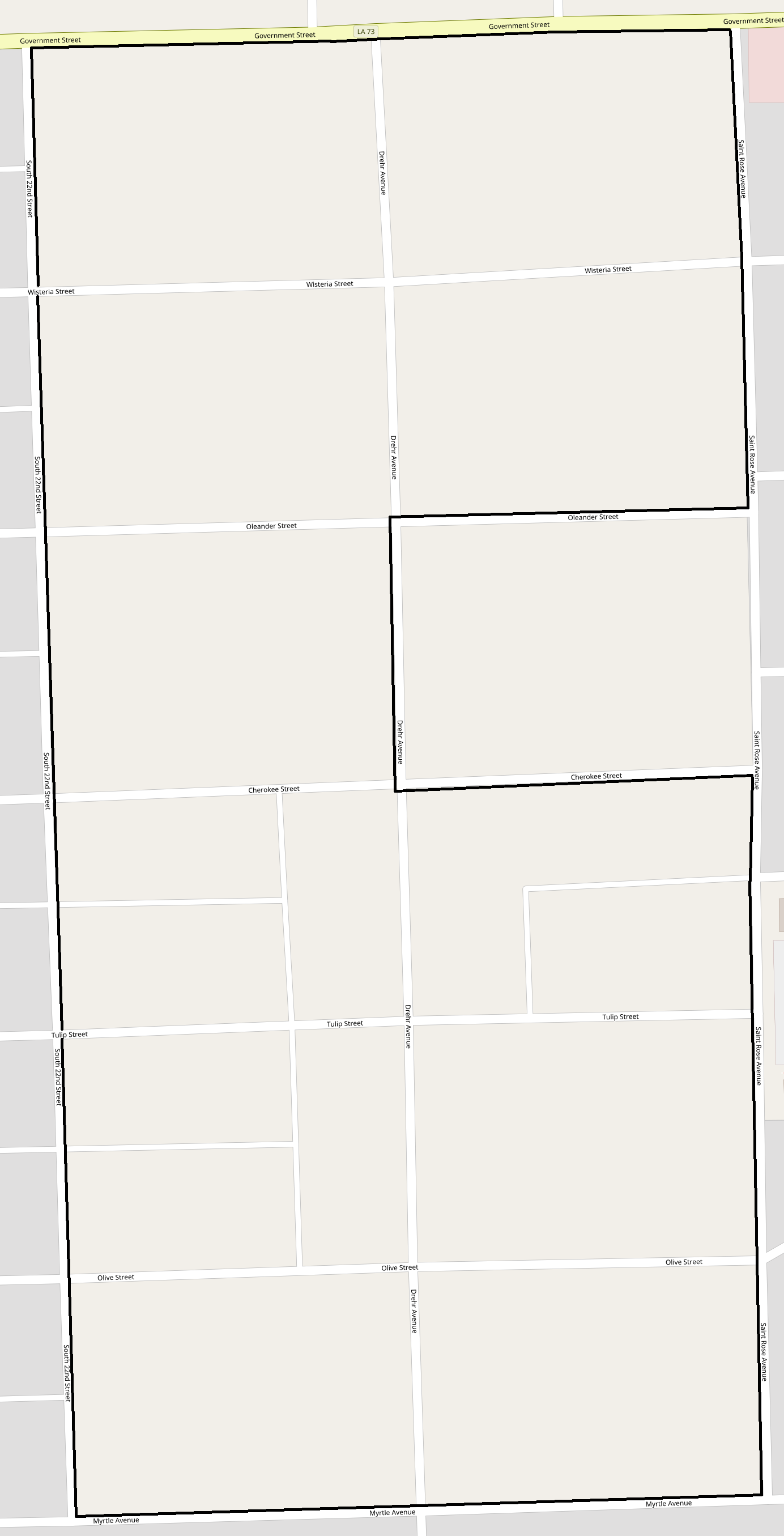
- Location: Roughly bounded by Government Street, South 22nd Street, Myrtle Avenue, and Saint Rose Avenue, Baton Rouge, Louisiana
- Coordinates: 30°26′29″N 91°09′49″W
- Area: 37 acres (15 ha)
- Built: 1919
- Architectural style: Tudor Revival, Bungalow/craftsman, Classical Revival
- NRHP reference No.: 97001422
- Added to NRHP: November 13, 1997

Drehr Place Historic District is roughly bounded by Government Street, South 22nd Street, Myrtle Avenue, and Saint Rose Avenue. The 37 acres (15 ha) area comprises a total of 112 resources, of which 89 are contributing properties. Almost all of the properties are one and two-story residences. The contributing Sanders House on Wisteria Street is also individually listed on the National Register of Historic Places.

Contributing buildings dates from 1921 to 1947. The origins of the district dates back to 1919, when Alvin L. Drehr purchased a 40 acres (16 ha) plot of land, then known as Kugler Tract. A 1922 map and a 1926 deed confirm the area to be named Drehr's Place.

The district was enlisted on the National Register of Historic Places on November 13, 1997. The East Baton Rouge Parish Historic Preservation Commission declared Drehr Place a local historic district in October 2005. The Drehr Place Historic Building Survey contains photographs of Drehr Place homes.

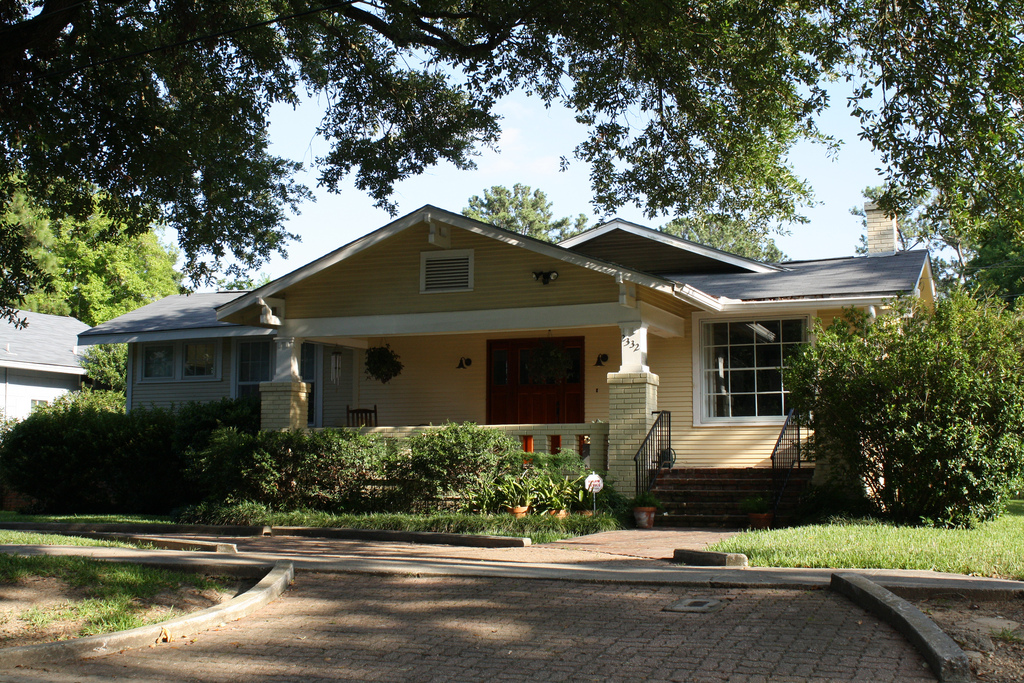
Sanders House on Wisteria Street

== Kleinert Terrace Historic District ==
- Kleinert Terrace Historic District
- U.S. National Register of Historic Places
- U.S. Historic district
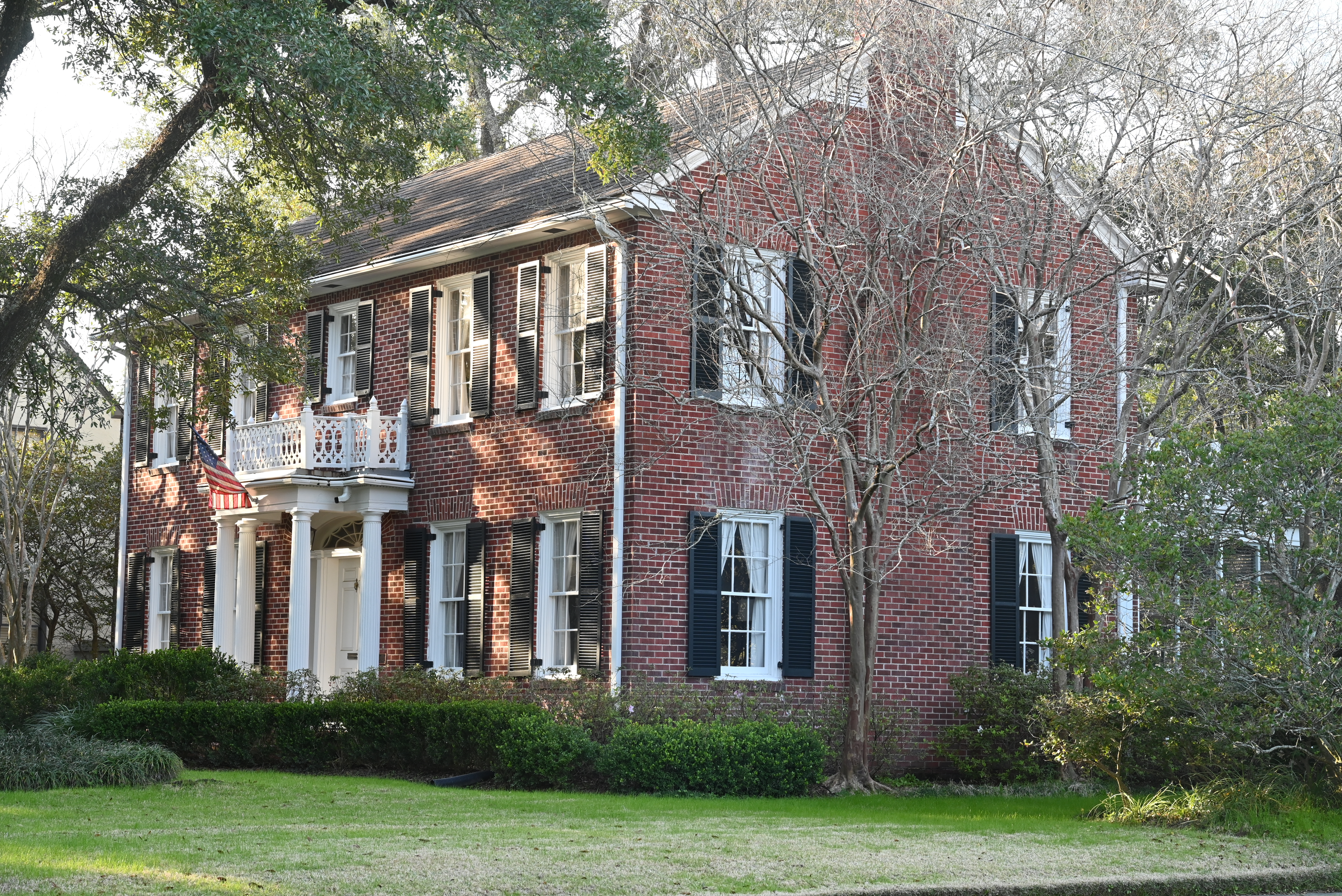

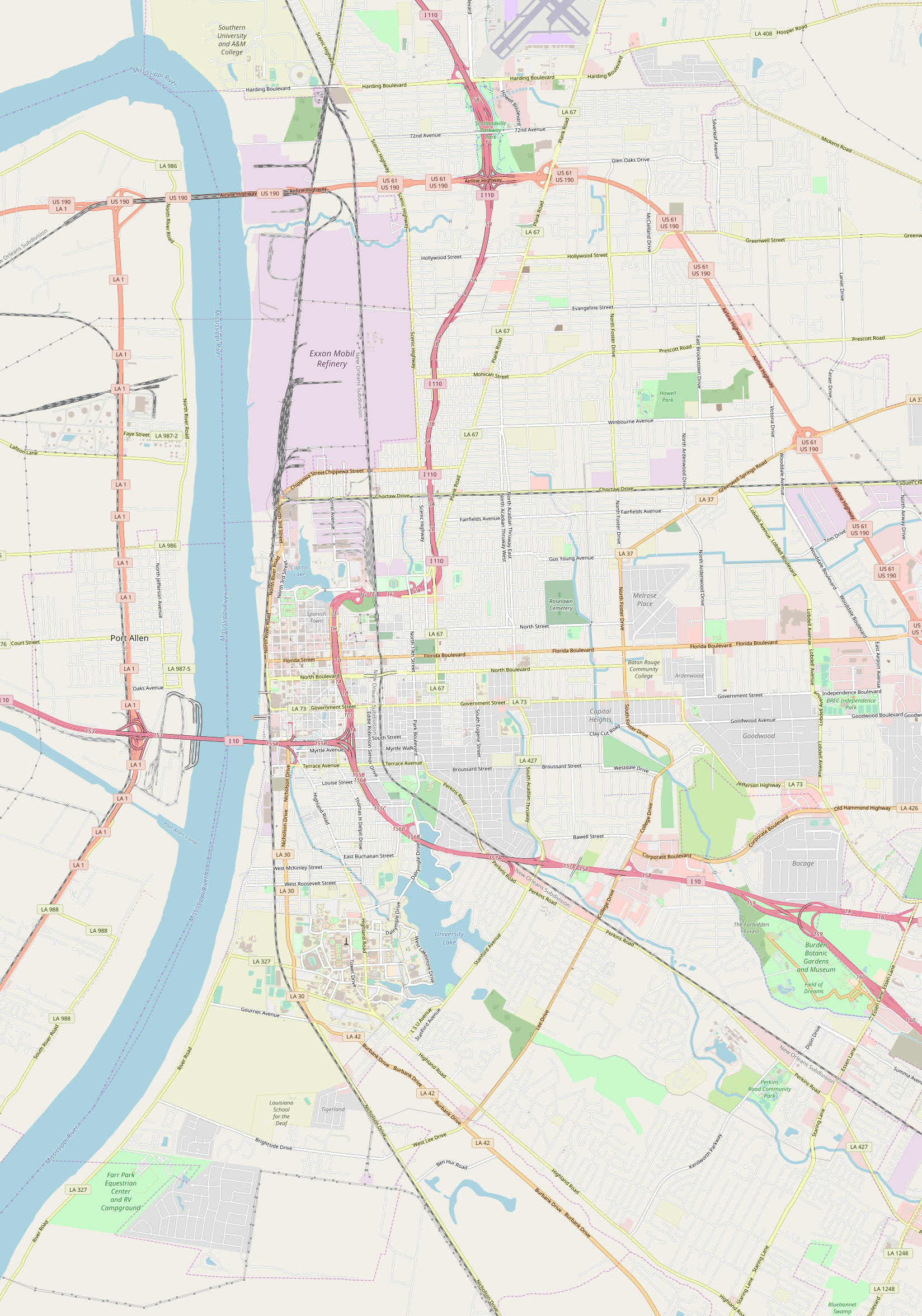
- Location within Baton Rouge

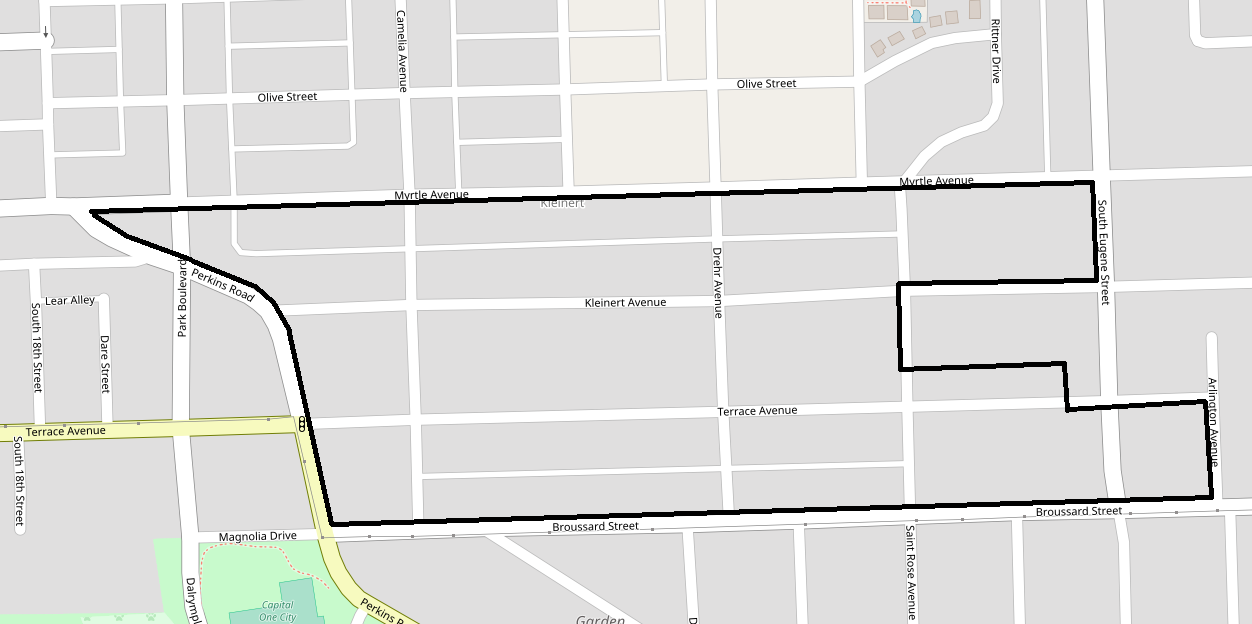
- Location: Roughly bounded by Myrtle Avenue, Perkins Road, Broussard Avenue, and South Eugene Street, Baton Rouge, Louisiana
- Coordinates: 30°26′14″N 91°09′49″W
- Area: 60 acres (24 ha)
- Built: 1927
- Architectural style: Colonial Revival, Tudor Revival
- NRHP reference No.: 98000180
- Added to NRHP: March 5, 1998

Kleinert Terrace Historic District is roughly bounded by Myrtle Avenue, Perkins Road, Broussard Street, and South Eugene Street. The 60 acres (24 ha) area comprises a total of 182 resources, of which 142 are contributing properties dating from 1927 to 1947. Almost all of the properties are one and two-story residences. The contributing Pecue House on Myrtle Avenue and Manship House on Kleinert Avenue are also individually listed on the National Register of Historic Places.

The district was enlisted on the National Register of Historic Places on March 5, 1998.

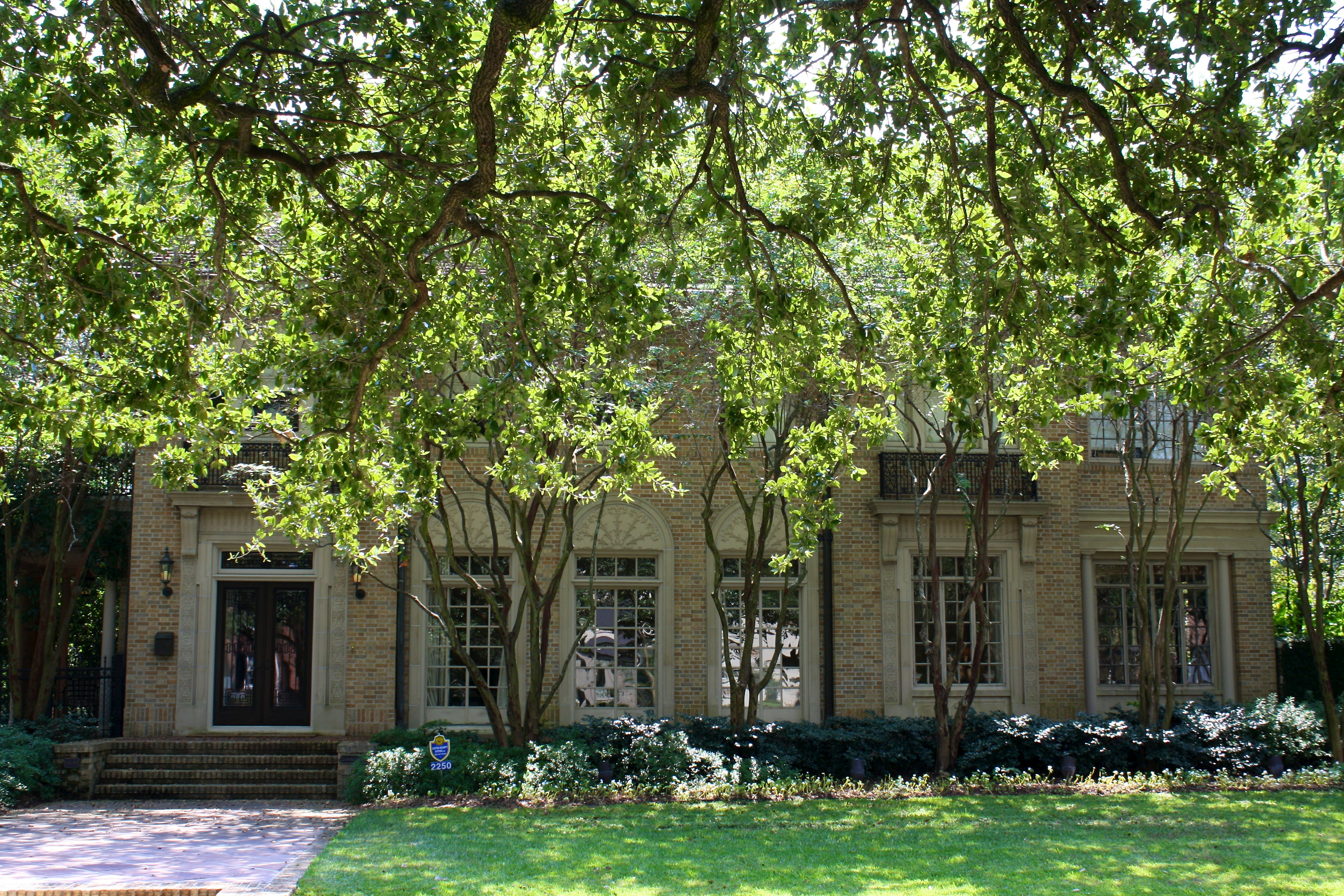
Manship House on Kleinert Avenue

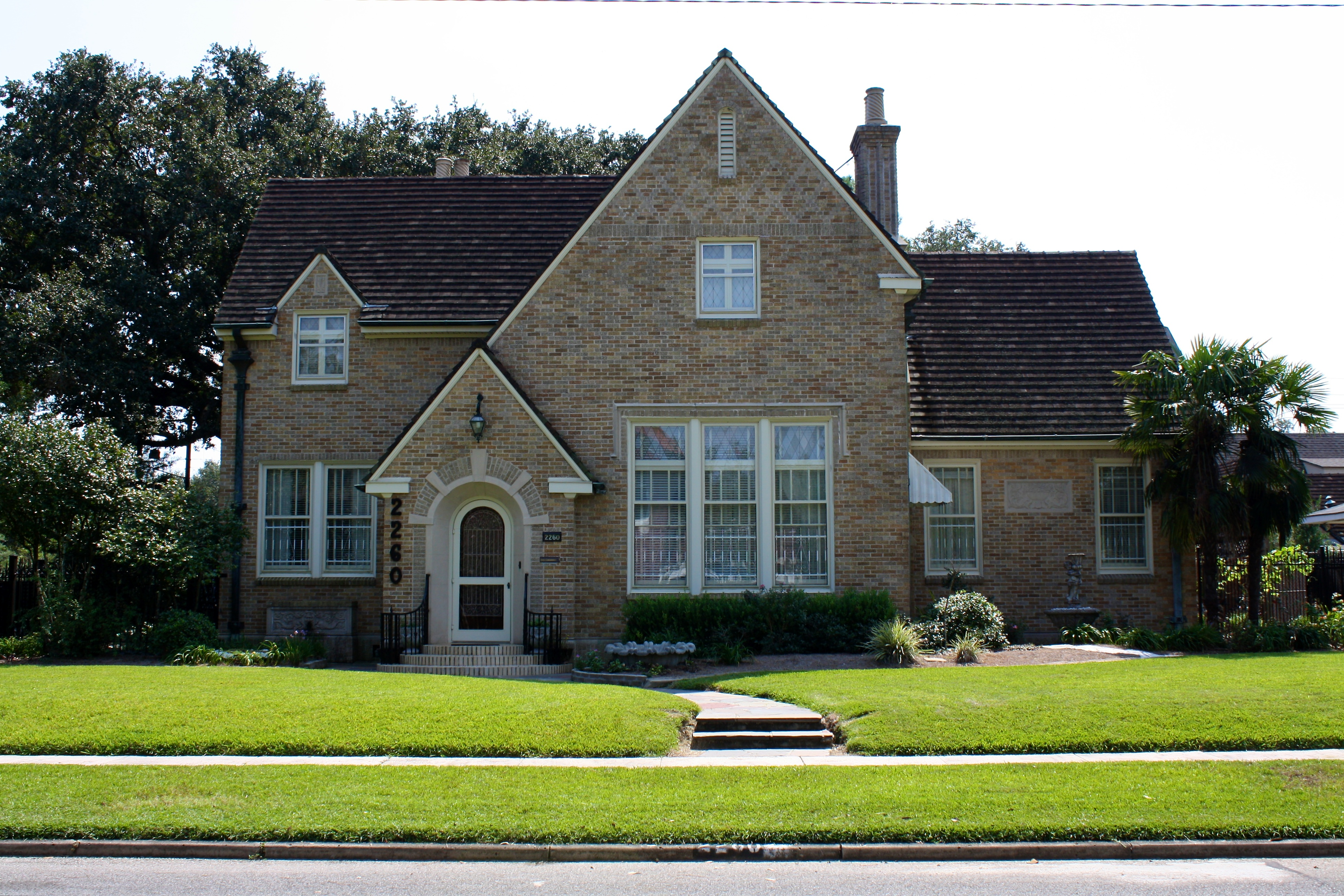
Pecue House on Myrtle Avenue

== The Garden District in popular culture ==
Steven Soderbergh, a former longtime resident who considers Baton Rouge his hometown, shot his first feature film, Sex, Lies, and Videotape, on location in the Garden District (Laura San Giacomo's character lives in a Garden District home) and other Baton Rouge neighborhoods; although not overtly set in Baton Rouge, the characters do speak of renting in the Garden District.

== See also ==
- National Register of Historic Places listings in East Baton Rouge Parish, Louisiana
