= William Reeve =

William Reeve may refer to:

- William Reeve (composer), English theatre composer and organist
- William Reeve (bishop), Anglican priest
- William Reeve (missionary), missionary to India
- William Reeve (rower), English rower

== See also ==
- William Reeves (disambiguation)
