= Simon Reeve =

Simon Reeve may refer to:

- Simon Reeve (Australian TV presenter) (born 1961), Australian television presenter
- Simon Reeve (British TV presenter) (born 1972), British author and television presenter
