= Reeves =

Reeves may refer to:

== People ==
- Reeves (surname)
- B. Reeves Eason (1886–1956), American director, actor and screenwriter
- Reeves Nelson (born 1991), American basketball player

== Places ==
Ireland

- Reeves, County Kildare, townland in County Kildare

United States

- Reeves, Georgia, unincorporated community
- Reeves, Louisiana, village in Allen Parish
- Reeves County, Texas

== Companies and institutions ==
- House of Reeves, furniture store in Croydon, London, England
- Reeves and Sons, English artists' materials firm
- Reeves College, college in Alberta, Canada
- Reeves Instrument Corporation (RICO), Cold War manufacturer of computer and radar systems for the United States
- Reeves Pulley Company, transmission and engine manufacturer in Columbus, Indiana founded by Milton Reeves

== Ships ==
- USS Reeves (DE-94), Buckley-class destroyer escort delivered to the Royal Navy as HMS Cosby (K559)
- USS Reeves (DE-156), Buckley-class destroyer escort launched 1943
- USS Reeves (DLG-24), Leahy-class destroyer leader launched 1962

== See also ==
- Reeve (disambiguation)
- "The Reeve's Tale", third story told in The Canterbury Tales by Geoffrey Chaucer
- Reeves of Bath, prominent firm of monumental masons (tombstone carvers) in Bath, Somerset that flourished from c. 1778 to the 1860s
- Reeves Field, also known as Reeves Stadium, football stadium located on the campus of Geneva College in Beaver Falls, Pennsylvania
- Reeves House (disambiguation)
- Reeves & Mortimer, British comedy act
