= Reeve =

Reeve may refer to:

== Titles ==
- Reeve (Canada), an elected chief executive of some counties, townships, and equivalents
- Reeve (England), an official appointed by the kings and lords in the medieval period to carry out local administrative duties
- High-reeve, a title taken by some English magistrates during the 10th and 11th centuries
- Shire reeve, an official position that originated the term Sheriff
- Vogt, an official in many European countries, often translated reeve

== Other uses ==
- Reeve (surname), list of notable people with the surname
- Reeve, Wisconsin, an unincorporated community
- Reeve knot, a stopper knot
- Reeve, a female ruff (bird), a wading bird
- Reeve (Final Fantasy), a character from the video game Final Fantasy VII
- Reeve Electric Association Plant, listed on the National Register of Historic Places in Franklin County, Iowa
- "The Reeve's Prologue and Tale", from The Canterbury Tales by Chaucer
- Leander Reeve House, listed on the National Register of Historic Places in Franklin County, Iowa
- To reeve a line through blocks in order to gain a mechanical advantage, a nautical term

== See also ==
- Reave, boundary wall
- Reeves (disambiguation)
