= Pfuel =

German ancient noble family

Pfuel family
- Noble family
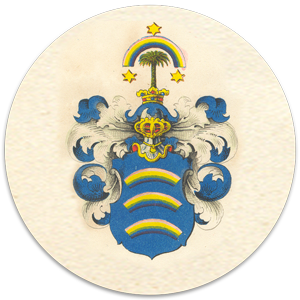
- Coat of arms of Pfuel
- Country: Holy Roman Empire; German Empire
- Founded: 926; 1100 years ago
- Current head: Christian Friedrich Graf Bruges-von Pfuel, (* 1942)
- Titles: See list: Extant titles; Uradel; Ritter; Freiherr; Graf
- Motto: Muth und Hoffnung ("Courage and Hope")
- Estates: Tüßling Castle; Mamhofen, Starnberg
- Cadet branches: Pfuhl; Phull
- Website: jahnsfelder-chronik.de schloss-tuessling.de

The Pfuel family, also known as Pfuhl or Phull, is an ancient German noble family with a history that traces back to the year 926 when they first arrived in Brandenburg with King Henry the Fowler, who started governing the region in 928–929, allowing Emperor Otto I to establish the Northern March in 936 during the German Ostsiedlung. Over the centuries, the Pfuel extended their influence across various regions including Saxony, Saxony-Anhalt, Mecklenburg, Pomerania, Württemberg, Westphalia, Eastern Europe, and Sweden.

== History ==
The Pfuel family is one of the oldest and most venerable families in Brandenburg-Prussian history and has made significant marks in German and European history. They were among the families with the largest holdings and incomes in the Margraviate of Brandenburg. Their lineage includes several influential figures who played key roles in military, governance, and political reforms, including a Prussian Minister of War and Prime Minister of Prussia. Twenty-five of them served as generals. Having acquired sixteen military medals Pour le Mérite - the highest award for bravery that could be awarded in the Kingdom of Prussia, they are the second highest decorated family.

The Pfuels came to the March so early, that as early as 1603, in a funeral sermon given at the death of one of their own, they could be described not only as an 'excellent' but also as an 'ancient family'. A lineage from which 'equestris et literati ordinis viri', brave war shields and well-learned, intelligent and tried men, emerged.

— Theodor Fontane, Wanderungen durch die Mark Brandenburg, Das Oderland (1863)

Members of the family held the title of Count. Today, they bear the name Counts Bruges-von Pfuel.

== Family line ==
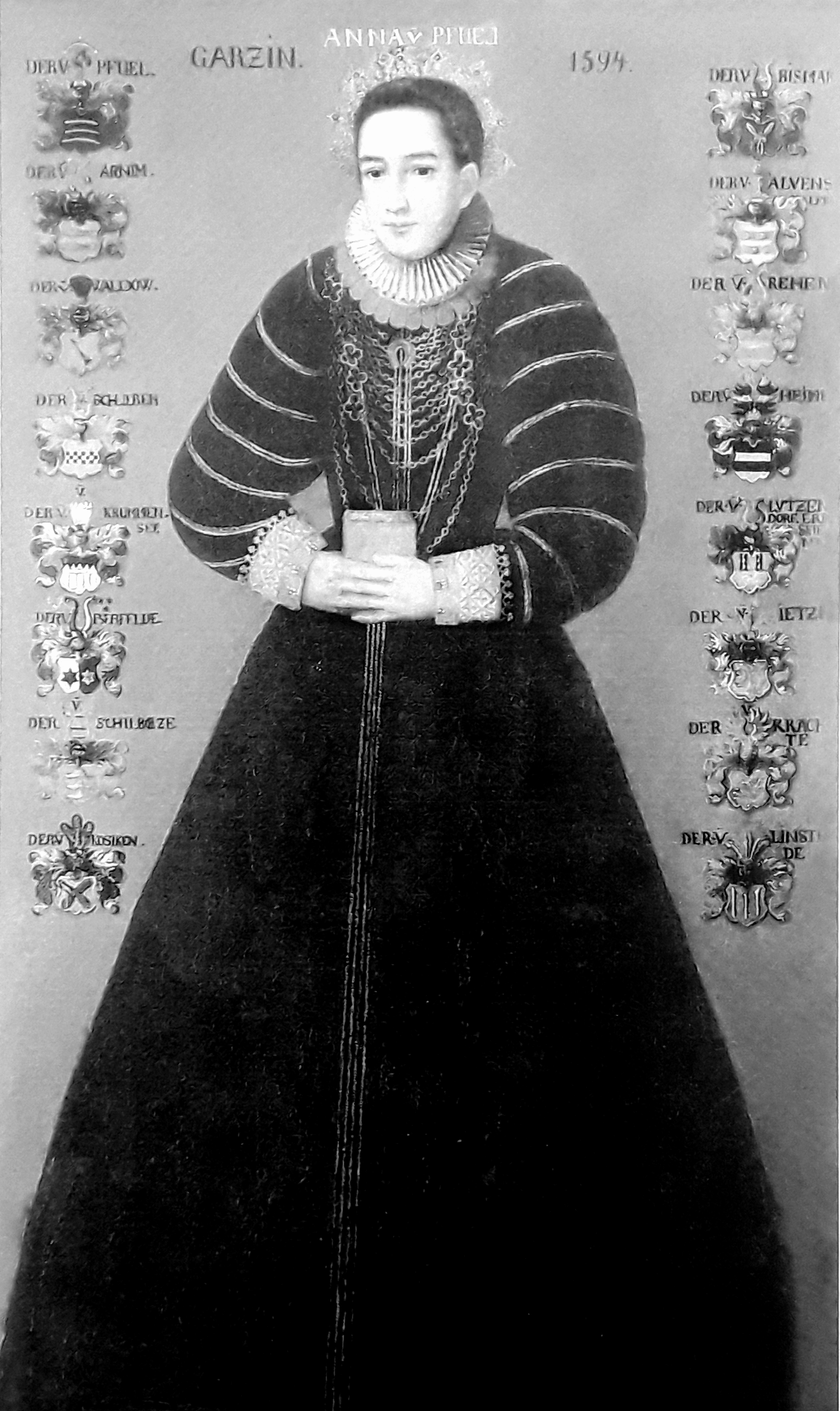
Anna von Pfuel, Oil on wood (1566)

Ancestors' list for direct paternal main line:

- Henricus de Puele, c. 1215
- Heino de Puele (1282–1307)
- Heino von Pule (1306–1349)
- Strassen von Pfuel (died 1375)
- Otto von Pfuel (1375–1420)
- Bertram von Pfuel (born. c. 1405–1410, died 1482), 1440 to 1477 documented
- Friedrich von Pfuel (1460–1527)
- Bertram von Pfuel (born 1510/1515, died 1574), 1531 to 1574 documented
- Friedrich von Pfuel (1545–1594), 1577 to 1587 documented
- Bertram von Pfuel (1577–1639), 1597 to 1638 documented
- Friedrich Heino von Pfuel (1620–1661)
- Christian Friedrich von Pfuel (1653–1702 near Kaiserswerth), KIA
- Hempo Ludwig von Pfuel (1690–1770 in Gielsdorf)
- Ludwig von Pfuel (1718 in Gielsdorf – 1789 in Berlin)
- Friedrich von Pfuel (1781 in Jahnsfelde – 1846 in Karlsbad)
- Alexander von Pfuel (1825 in Berlin – 1898 in Jahnsfelde)
- Heino von Pfuel (1871 in Jahnsfelde – 1916 in Berlin), DOW
- Curt Christoph Graf Bruges-von Pfuel (1907 in Berlin – 2000 in Bonn)
- Christian Friedrich Graf Bruges-von Pfuel (born 1942 in Jahnsfelde)
- Frederic Alexander Graf Bruges-von Pfuel (born 1978 in Munich)

== Estates ==
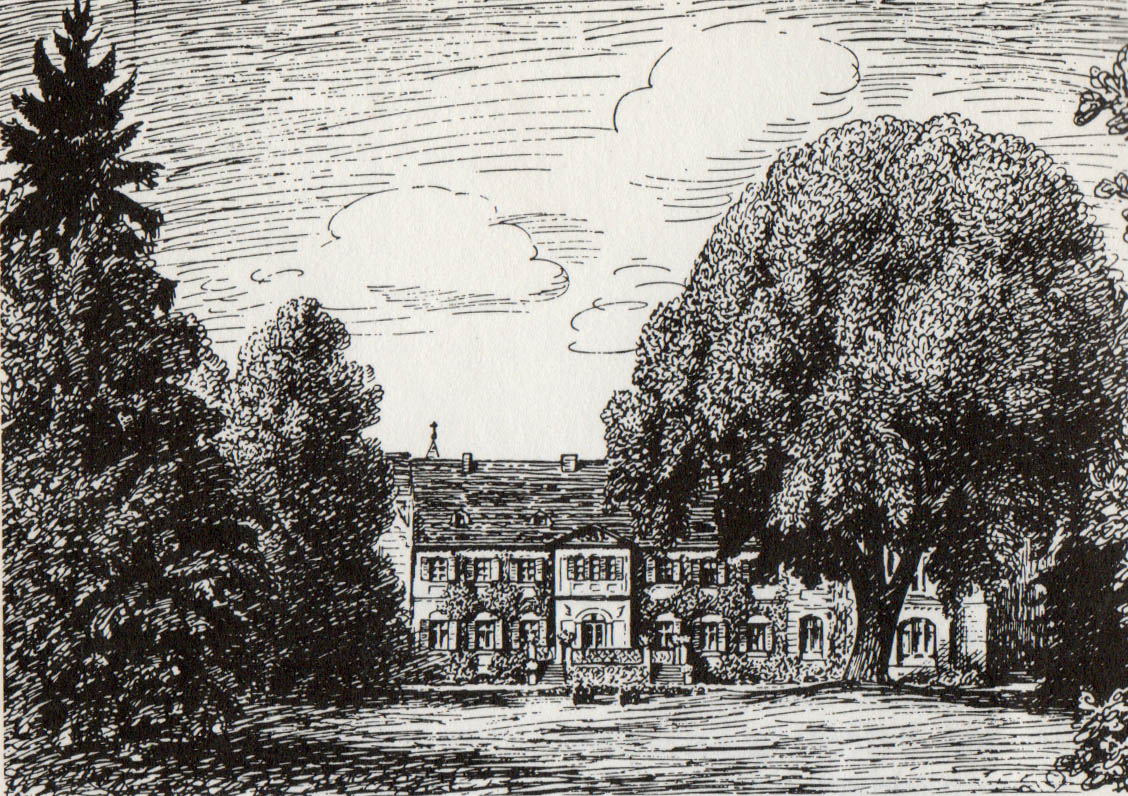
Jahnsfelde manor-house

=== Brandenburg ===
- 1367 Falkenberg
- 1375 Werftpfuhl, Altranft
- pre-1413 Frankenfelde, Bliesdorf, Reichenow, Möglin, Wollenberg, Schönfeld, Reichenberg, Biesow
- 1445 Wriezen
- 1449 Jahnsfelde
- 1450 Gielsdorf, Grünthal, Leuenberg, Schulzendorf
- 1472 Trebnitz
- 1480 Quilitz (Neuhardenberg)
- pre-1500 Tempelfelde, Torgelow, Tiefensee, Steinbeck, Quappendorf, Ruhlsdorf, Garzau, Garzin
- 1529 Friedersdorf
- 1536 Wilkendorf
- pre-1663 Buckow, Hohenfinow, Prötzel, Hasenholz, Dahmsdorf, Obersdorf, Kienitz, Münchehofe

=== Berlin ===
- Strausberg
- 1472 Biesdorf
- 1609 Marzahn
- 1655 Dahlem

=== Saxony-Anhalt ===
- 1641 Helfta
- 1654 Polleben
- 1664 Eisleben, Wimmelburg
- 1668 Seeben, Muldenstein
- 1680 Nedlitz

=== Baden-Württemberg ===
- 1787 Obermönsheim

=== Pomerania ===
- 1827 Schwerin
- 1838 Elmershagen

=== Bavaria ===
- 1991 Tüßling
- 1991 Gut Mamhofen (Starnberg)
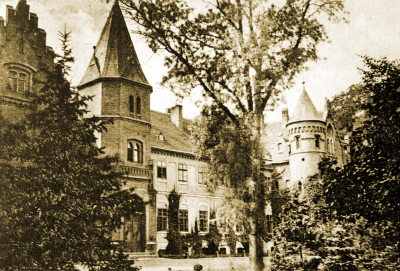
Jahnsfelde manor-house (1449–1945)

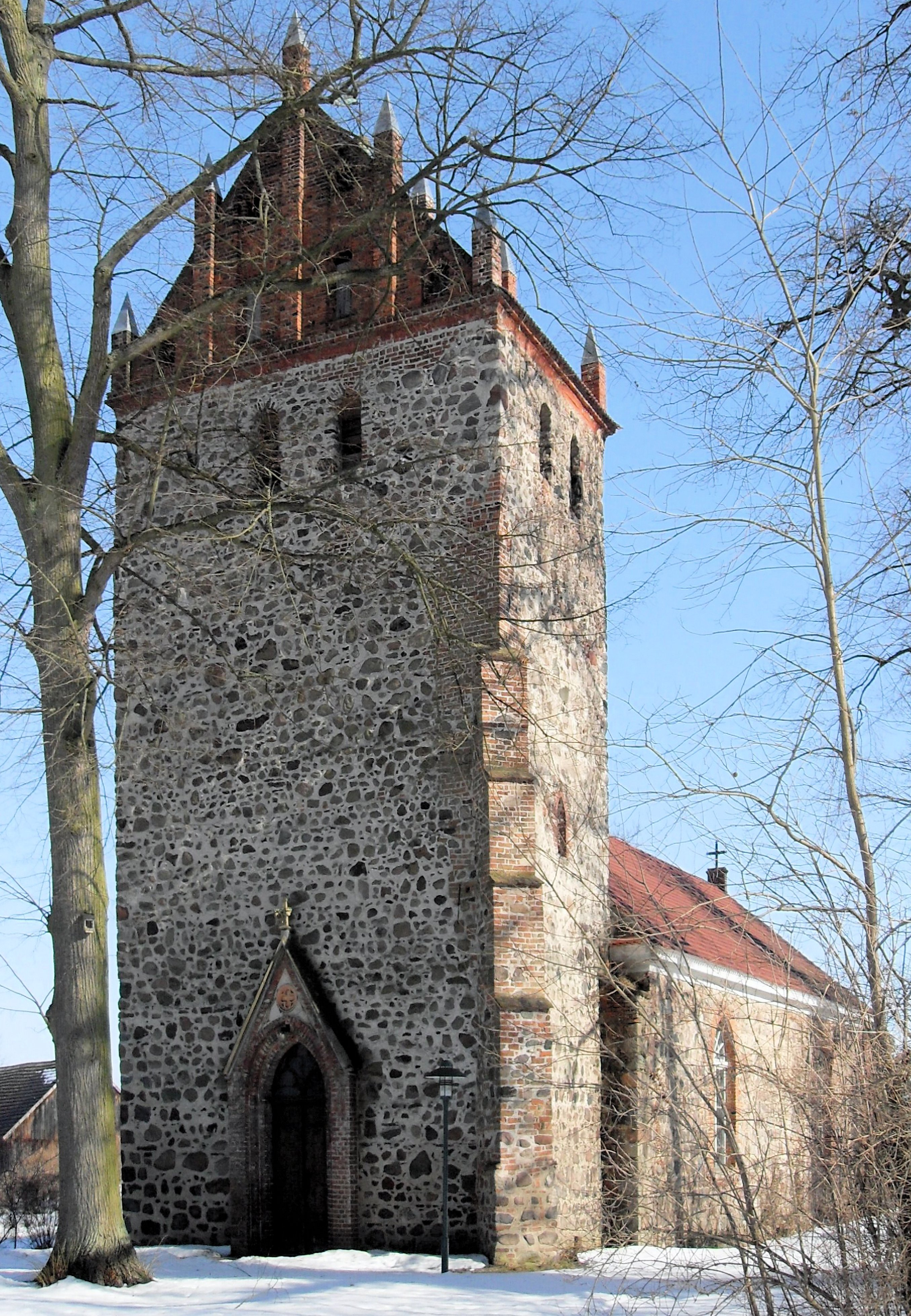
Family burial ground, Jahnsfelde

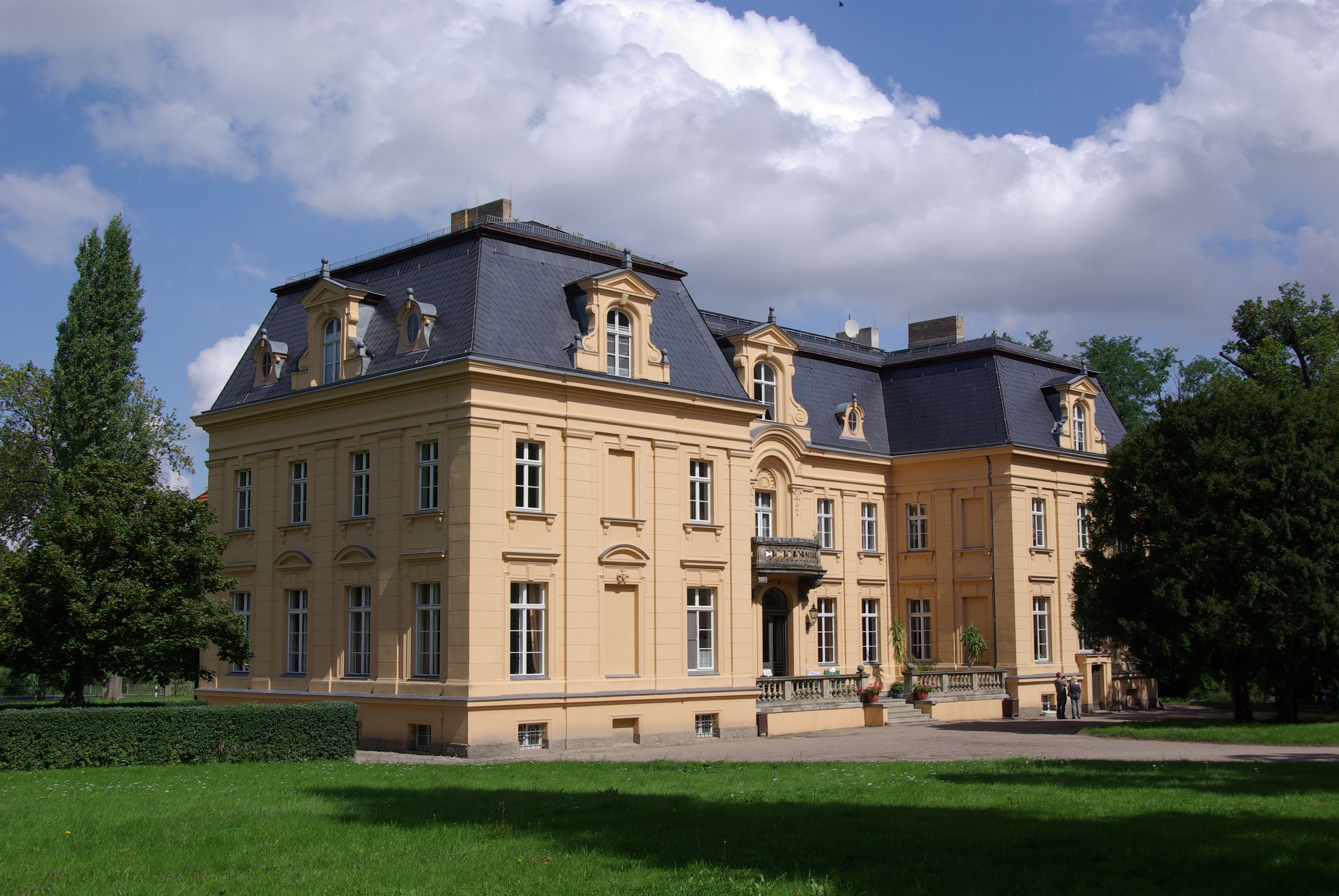
Altranft castle (1375–1652)

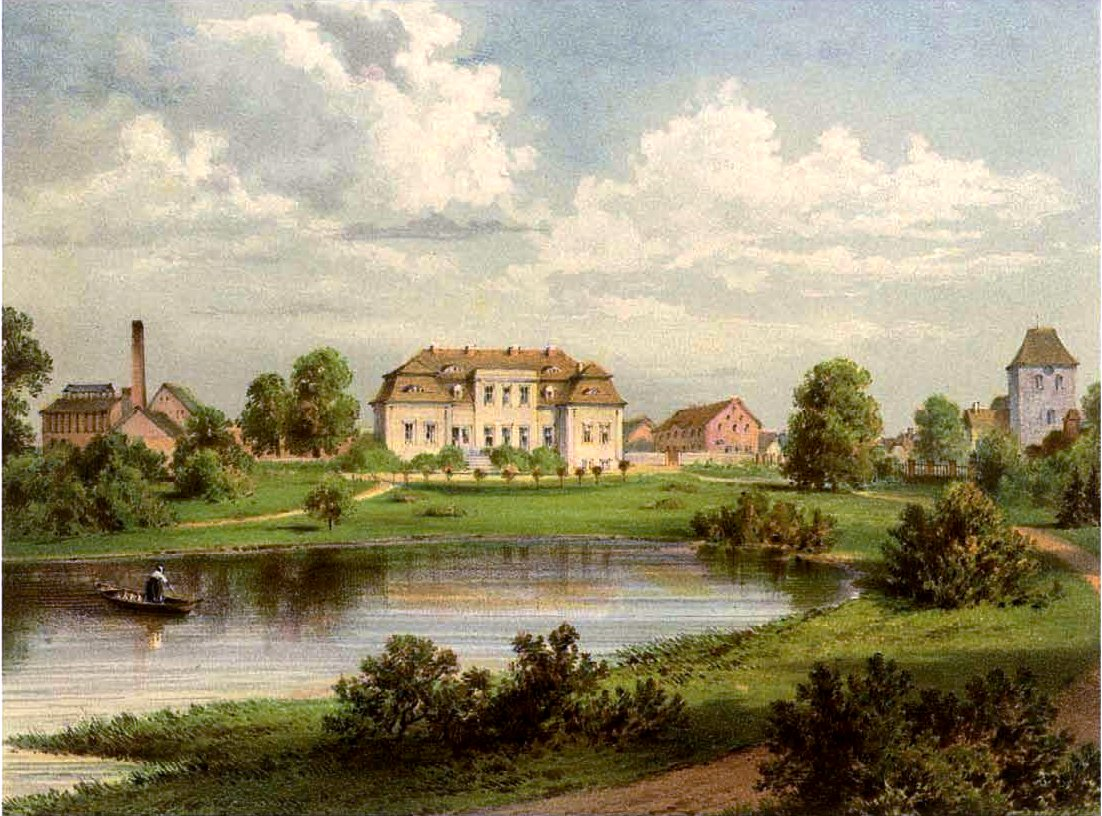
Schulzendorf castle (1450–1837)

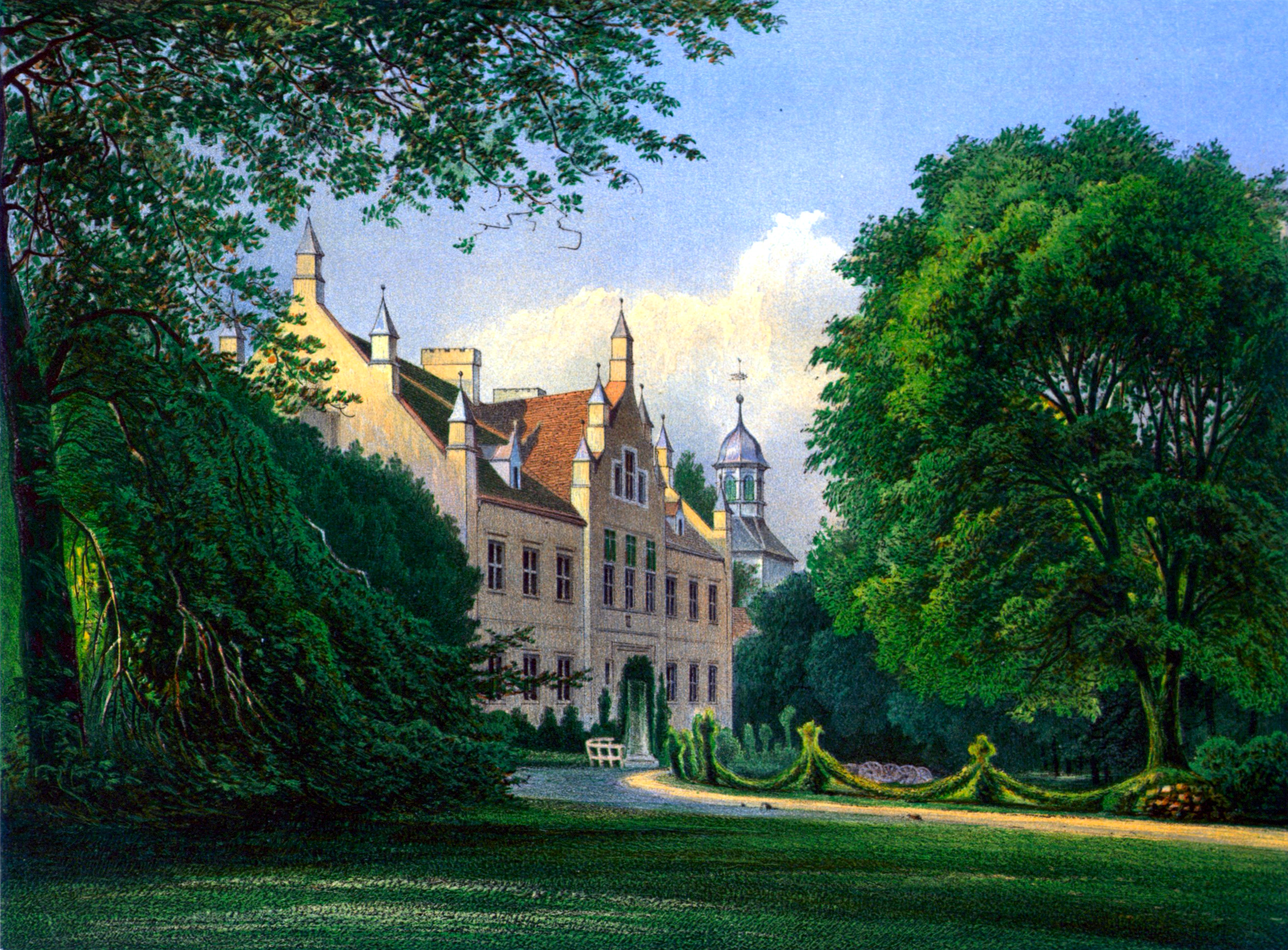
Friedersdorf castle (1529–1652)

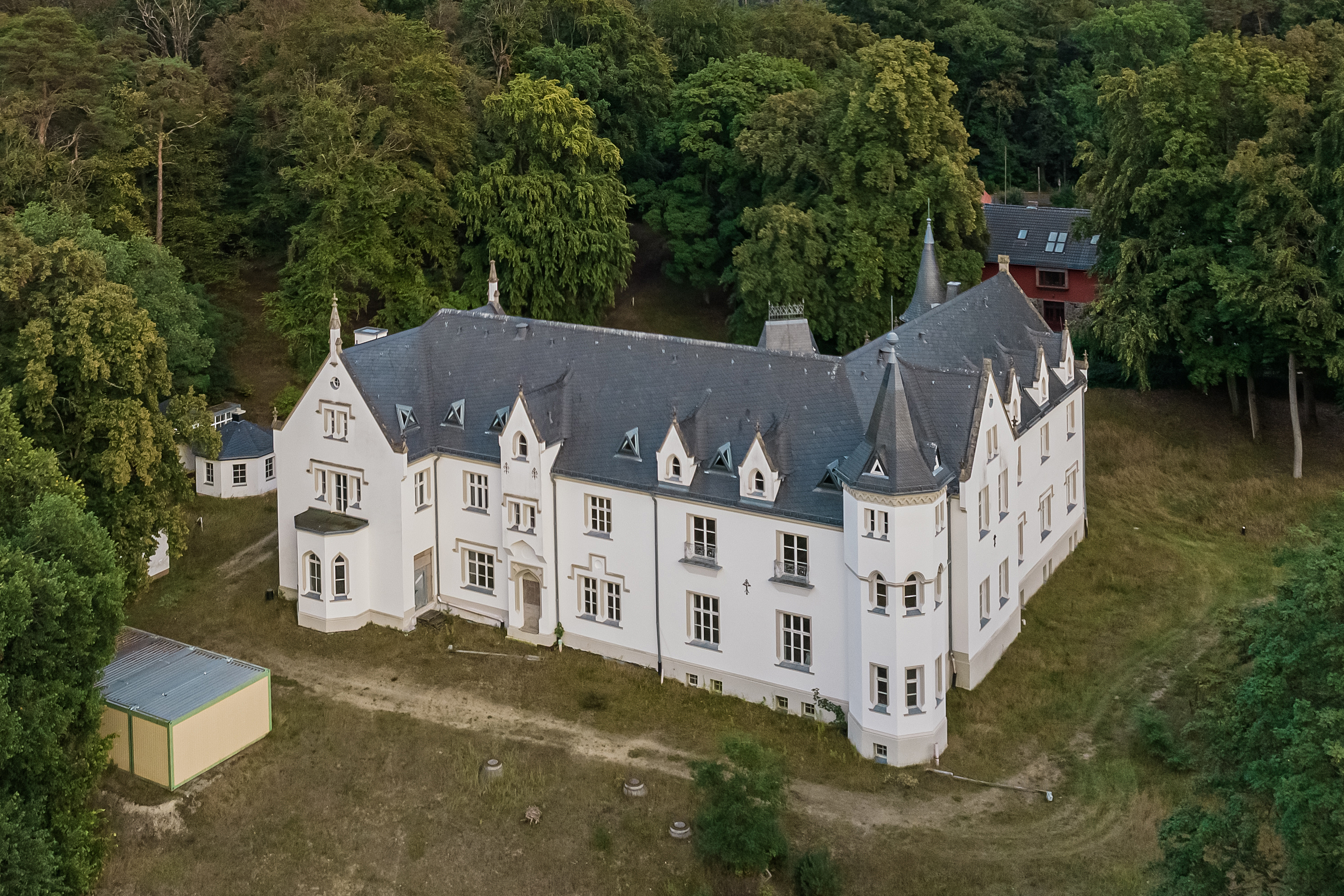
Wilkendorf castle (1536–1900)

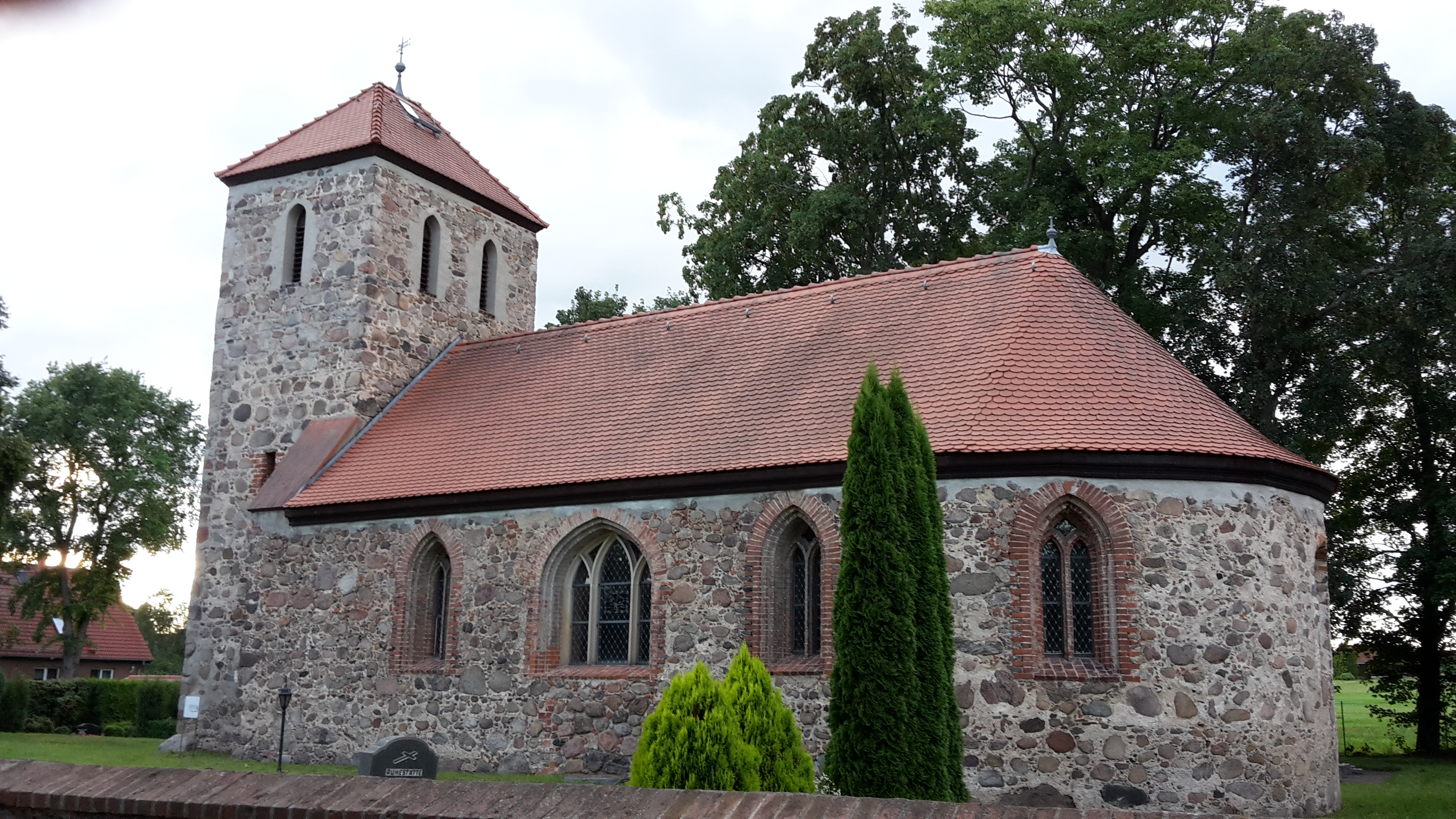
Family burial ground, Wilkendorf

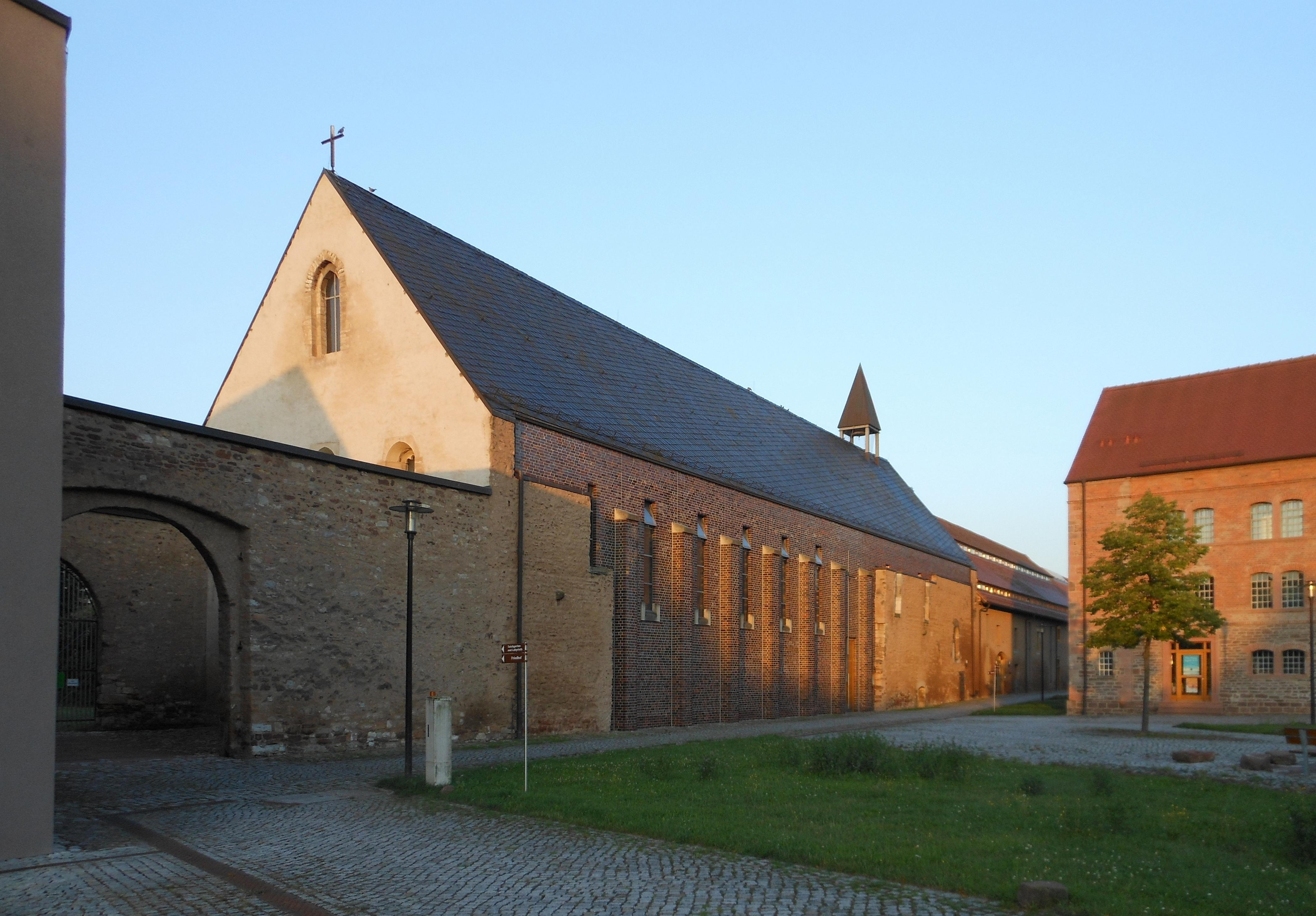
Helfta Convent (1641–1712)

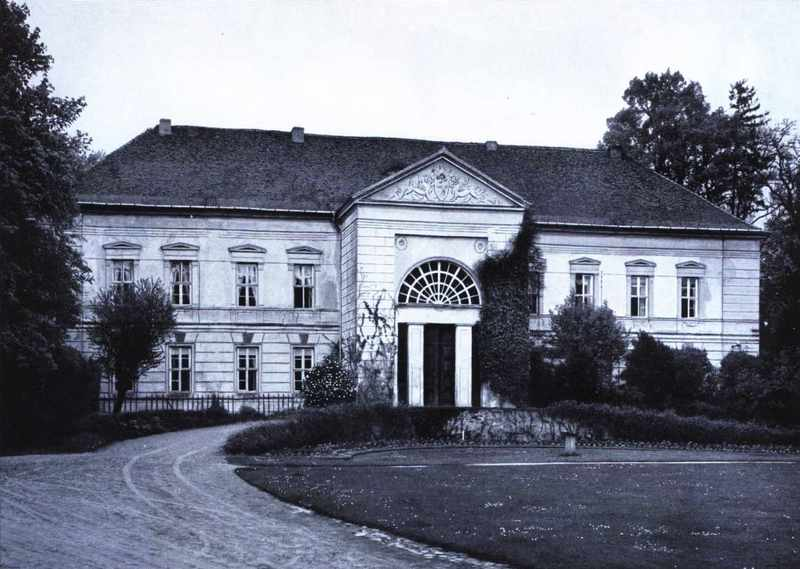
Buckow castle, built in 1663 by Georg Adam von Pfuel, 1688 inherited by his son-in-law, Field-Marshal Heino Heinrich Graf von Flemming

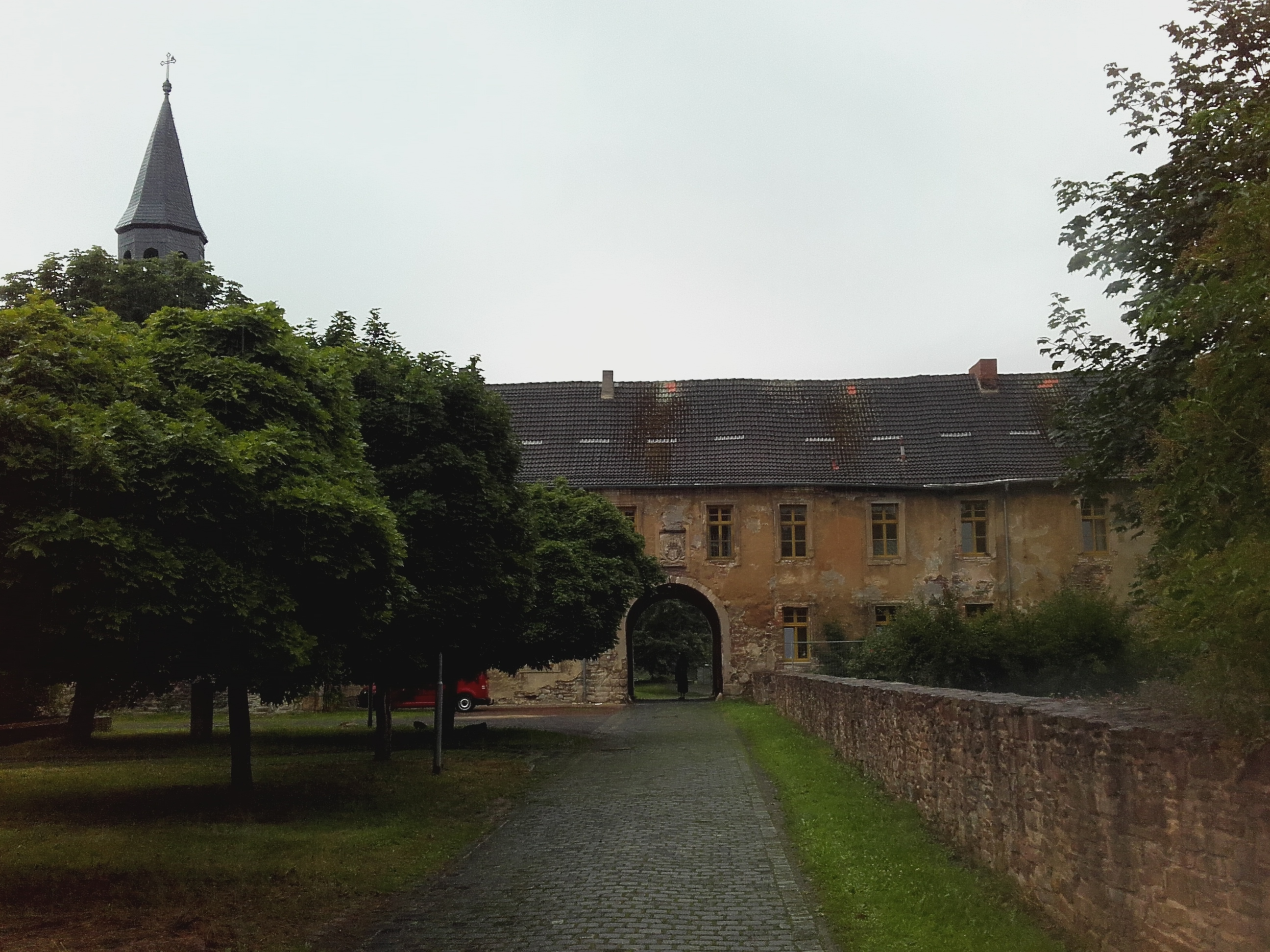
Wimmelburg monastery (1664–1798)

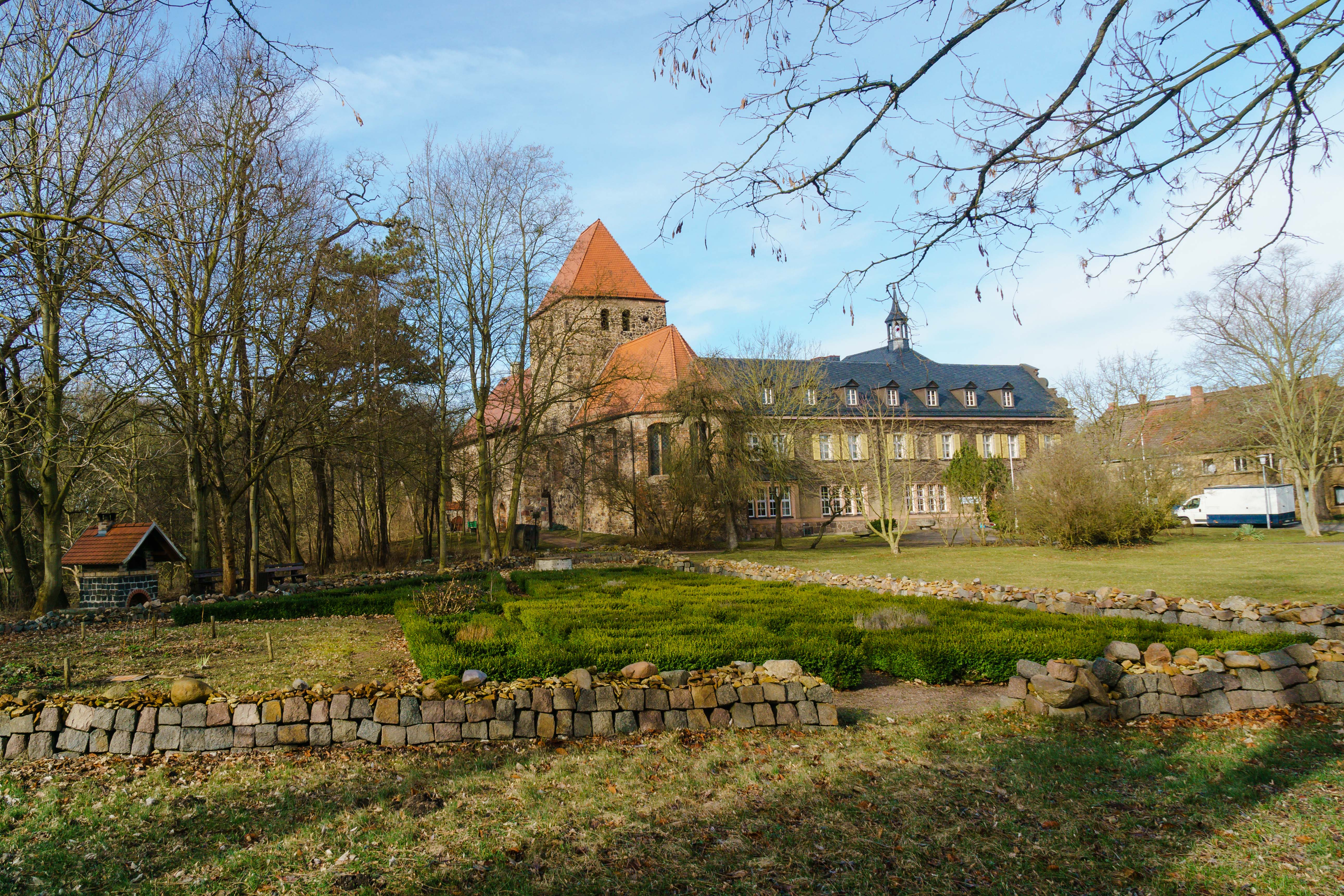
Muldenstein manor (1668–1822)

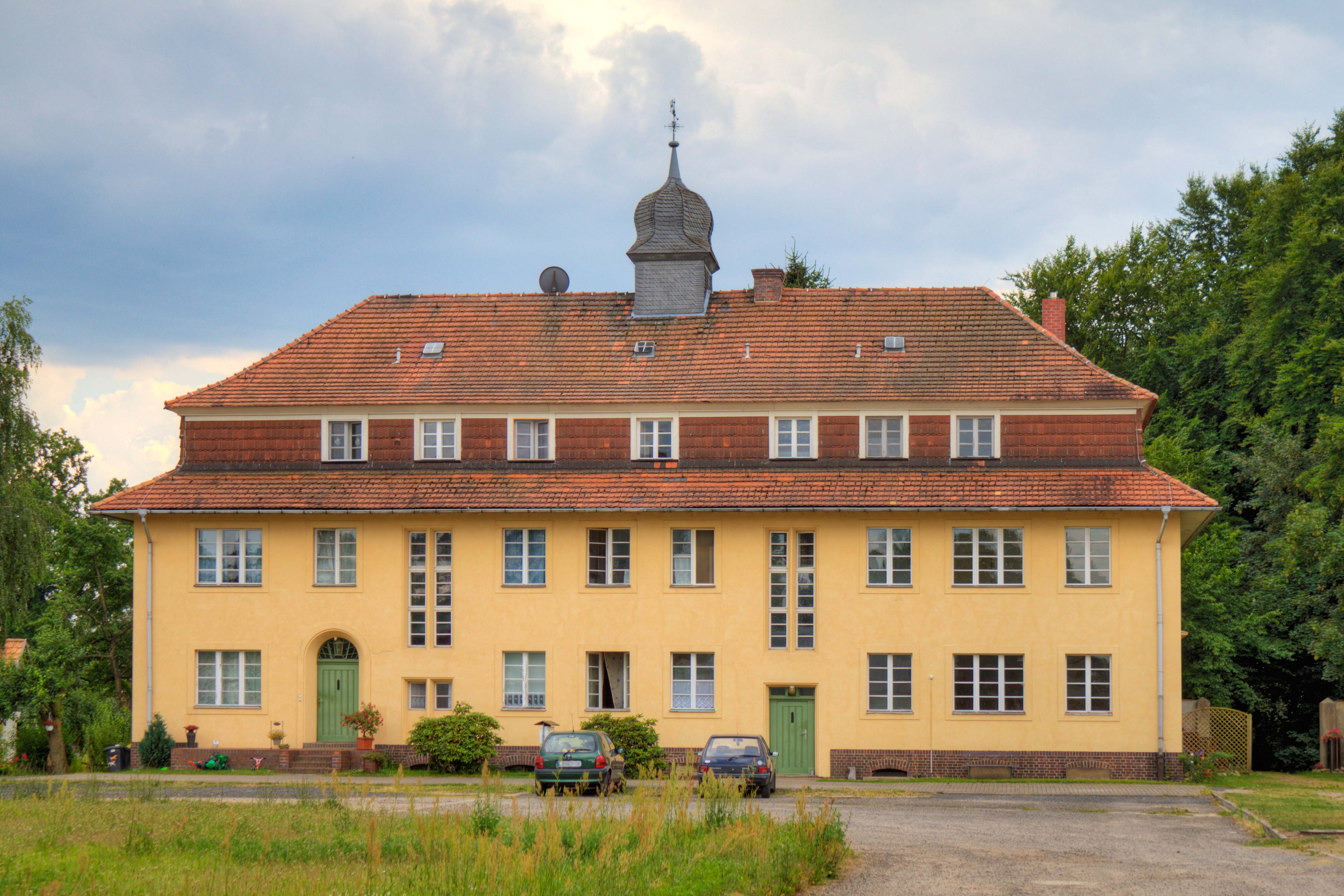
Waltersdorf estate (1739–ca.1900)

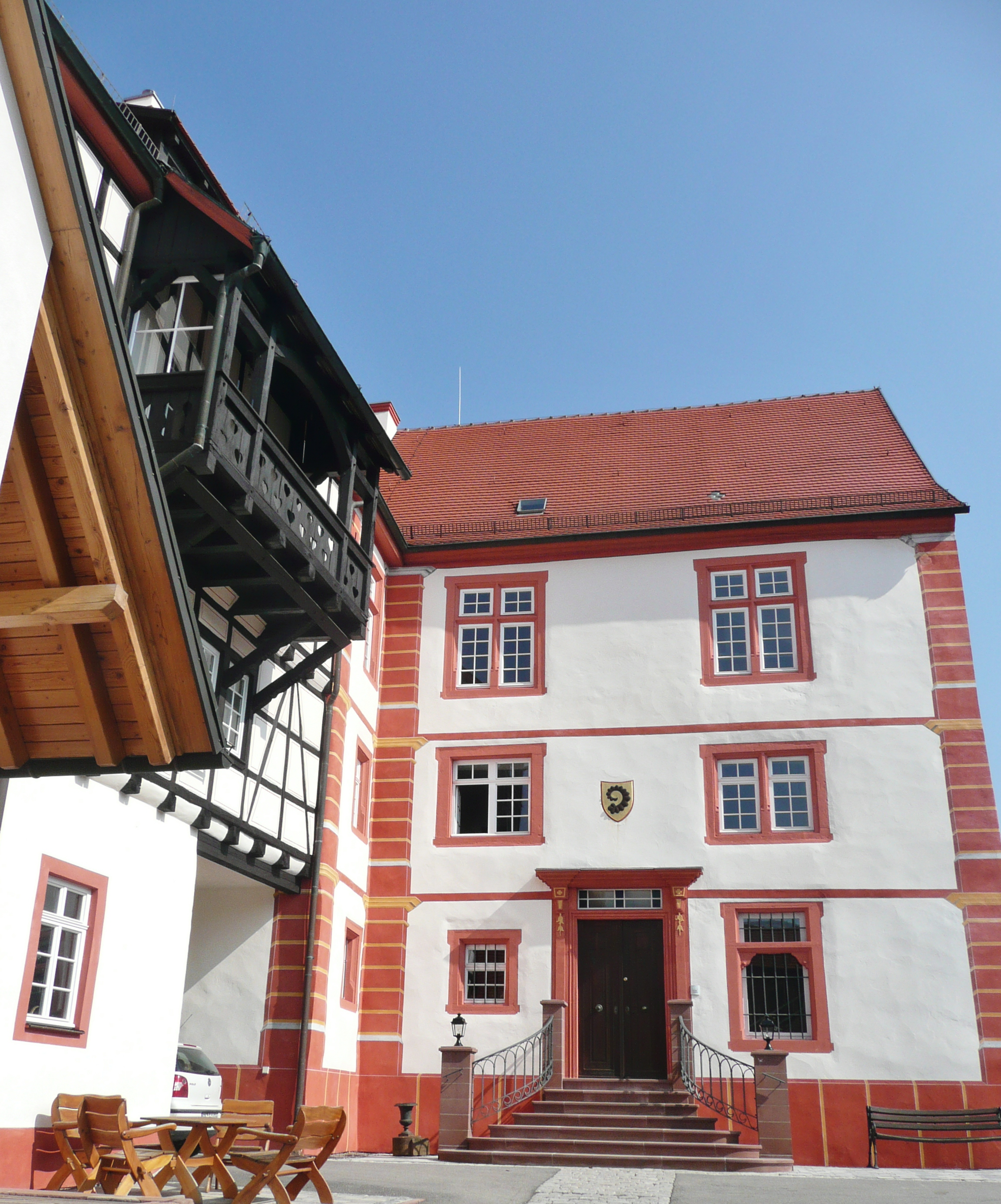
Obermönsheim castle, Baden-Württemberg (1787–1918)

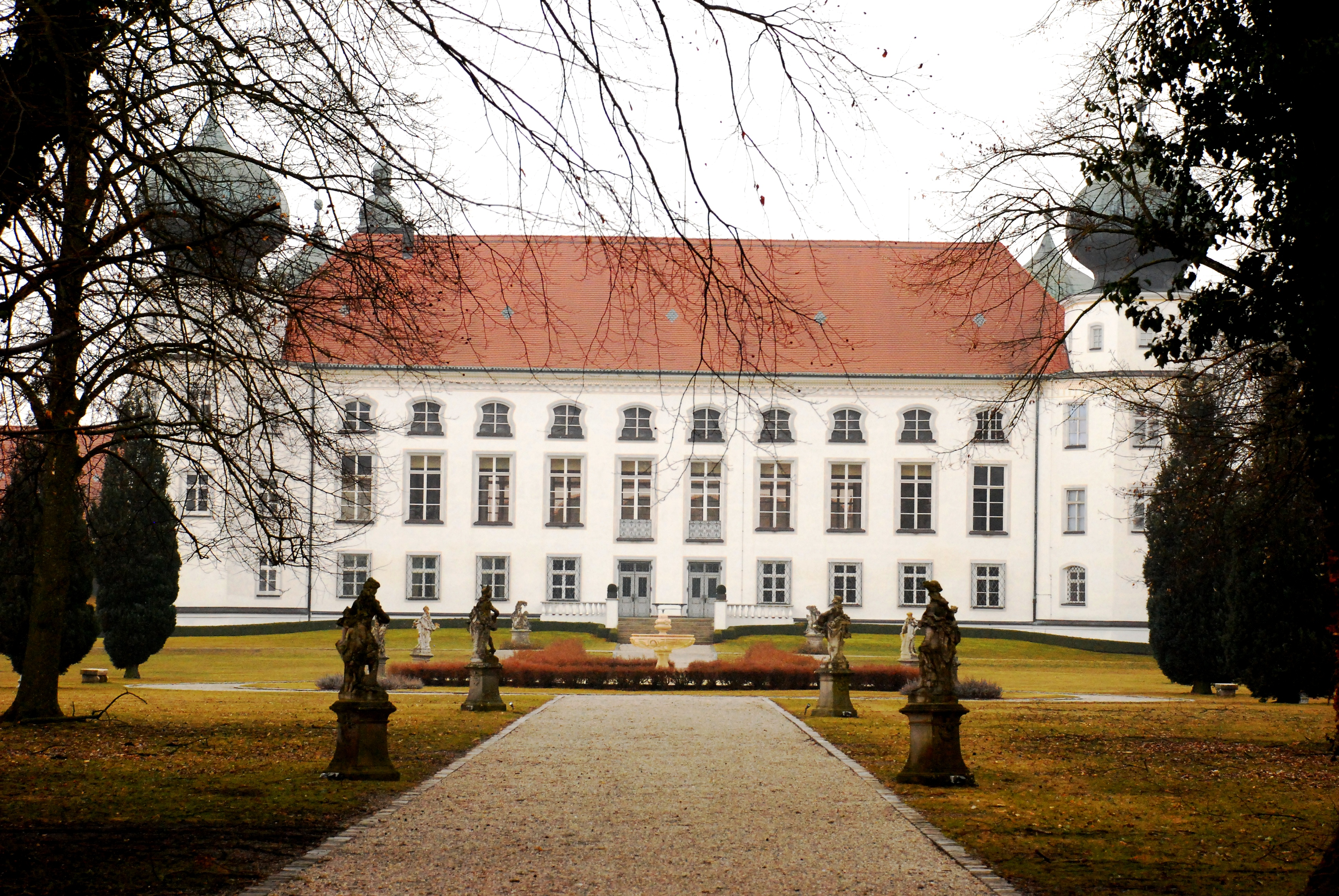
Tüßling castle, Bavaria (since 1991)

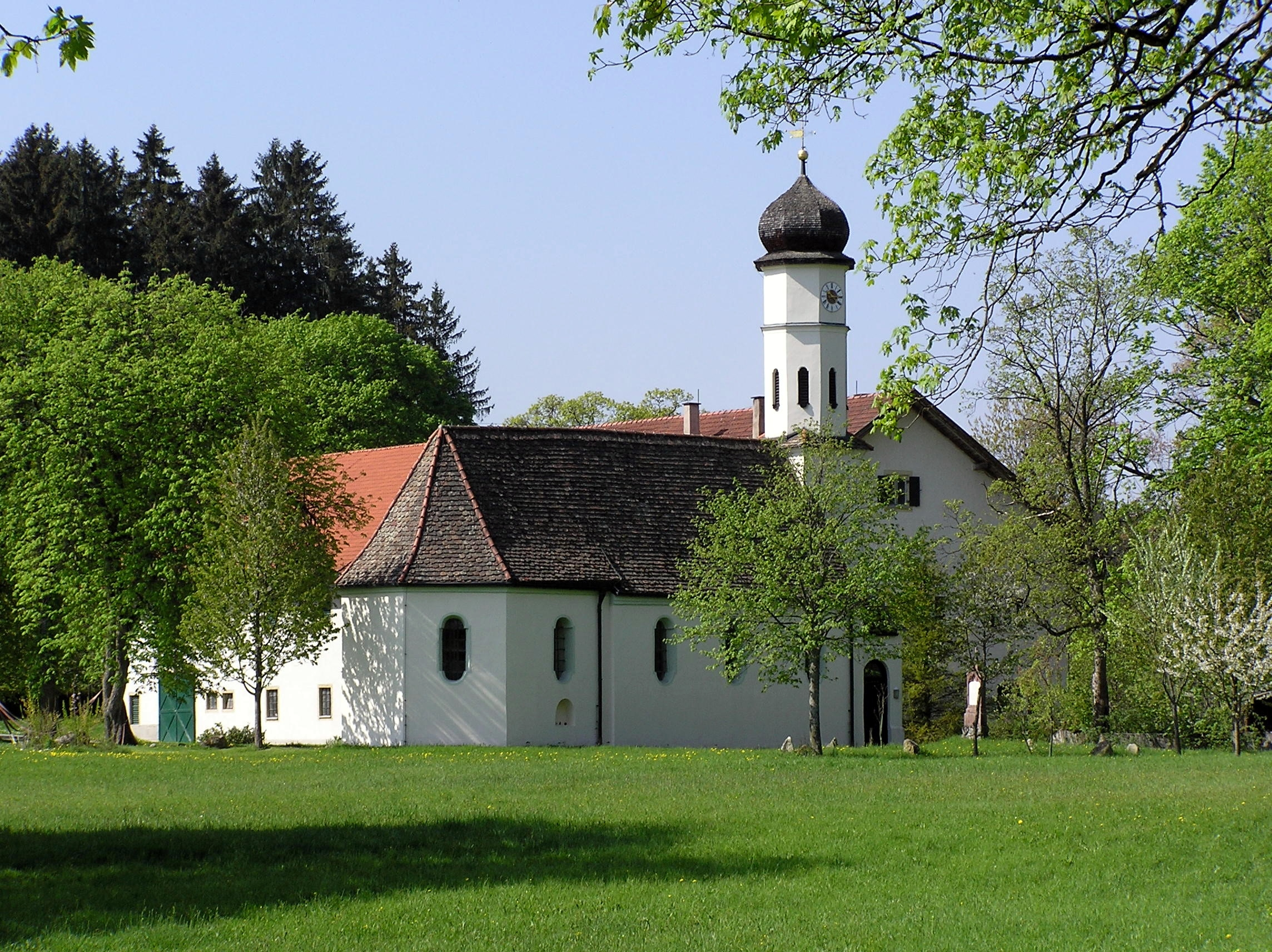
Mamhofen estate, Starnberg, Bavaria (since 1991)

== Members ==
Notable members of the family include:

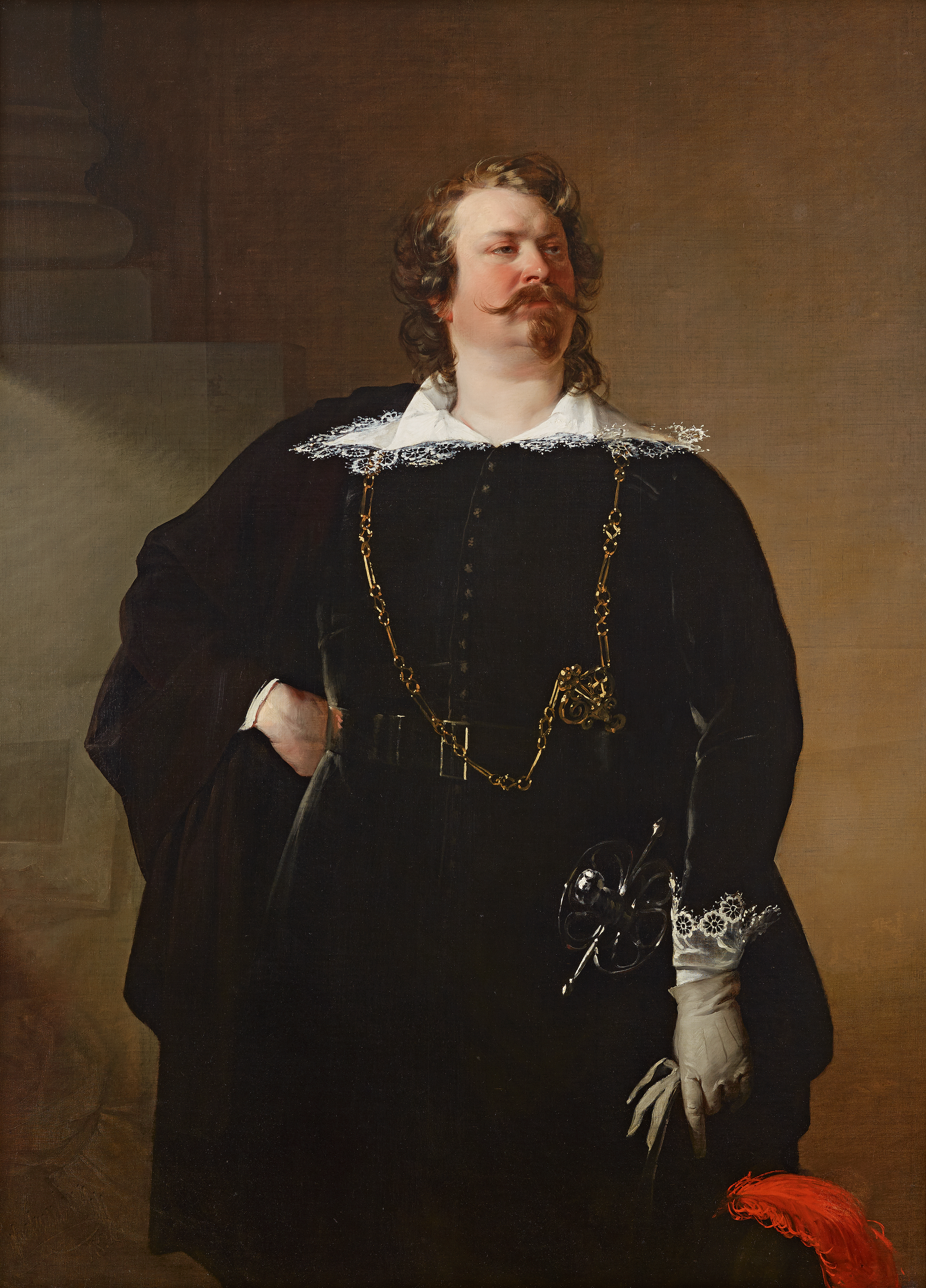
"Baron Pfuel", Friedrich von Amerling (1836), Belvedere, Vienna

- Adam von Pfuel (1604–1659), Swedish general, later Privy Councillor and General-War commissar in Danish service; son of Adam I. (1562–1626)
- Adam Dietrich von Pfuhl, electoral colonel, Domherr to the Prince-elector of Brandenburg (until 1671), member of the Fruitbearing Society.
- Adam Friedrich von Pfuhl (1643–c. 1707), electoral colonel, owner of the Salt evaporation pond in Kötzschau.
- Adam Heinrich Christoph, electoral colonel, as well as service at the court of the Duke of Saxe-Gotha; hereditary lord of Polleben and Stedern.
- Alexander Friedrich von Pfuel (1825–1898), royal Prussian Ritterschaftsrat, Knight of Justice of the Order of Saint John, Lord of Jahnsfelde; married to Anna (1835–1918), daughter of Carl Graf von Brühl, the Superintendent general of the Prussian royal theatres; son of Lieutenant General Friedrich Heinrich Ludwig von Pfuel, as well as father of dragoon officer Heino Friedrich (1871–1916), Lord of Jahnsfelde, DOW in World War I (1916).
- Anna-Elisabeth von Pfuel (1909–2005), aunt of Prince Claus of the Netherlands, great-aunt of King Willem-Alexander of the Netherlands; wife of Julius Freiherr von dem Bussche-Haddenhausen (1906–1977), who was the brother of Baroness Gösta von dem Bussche-Haddenhausen (1902–1996); sister of Curt-Christoph von Pfuel.
- Anna Katharine von Pfuel († 1657), daughter of Adam I. (1562–1626); mother of Georg Friedrich von Creytzen; great-grandmother of Countess Katharina Dorothea Finck of Finckenstein (1700–1728), progenitrix of several European imperial and royal families; great-great-grandmother of Friedrich Wilhelm, Duke of Schleswig-Holstein-Sonderburg-Glücksburg, father of King Christian IX of Denmark.
- Anna Maria von Phul (1786–1823), American artist
- Arndt Friedrich von Pfuel (1603–1673), Prussian lieutenant colonel; Lord of Schulzendorf, Schmöckwitz and Jahnsfelde.
- August Karl von Pfuhl (1794–1874), royal Prussian major general; father of Lieutenant General Emil von Pfuhl
- August von Phull (* 1769), royal Wurttembergian Chamberlain, Premier Captain of the Palace Guard (Ober-Schloßhauptmann); son of General of the Artillery (Generalfeldzeugmeister) Friedrich August Heinrich Leberecht von Pfuhl (1735–1818)
- August Christoph Adolf von Pfuhl (* 1768), royal treasurer, later senior forestry official (Oberforstmeister) near Trier; son of General Ernst Ludwig von Pfuhl (1716–1798)

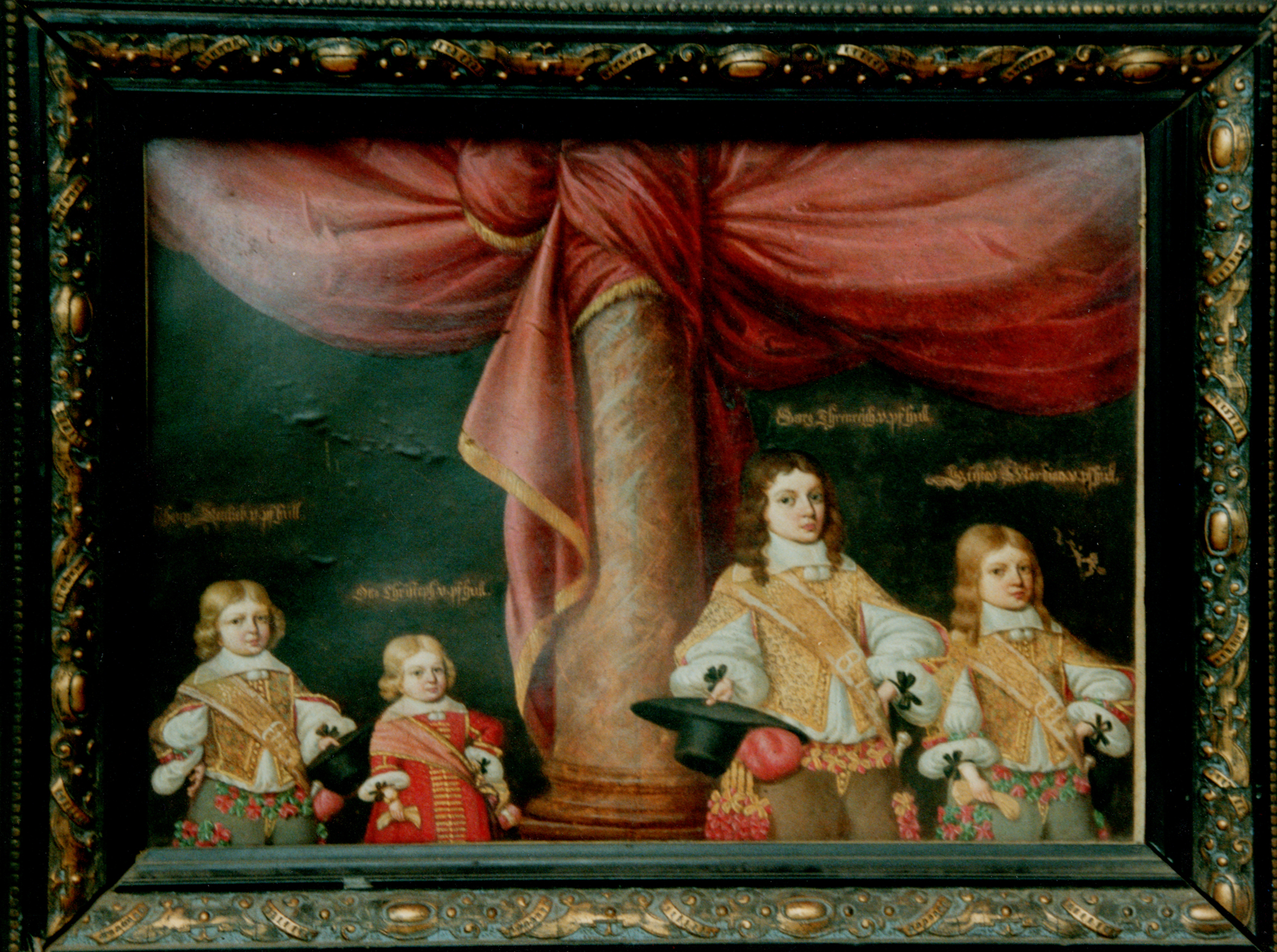
Children of the Pfuel family, mid 17th century

- Barbara von Pfuel († 1637), mother of Field Marshal Heino Heinrich Graf von Flemming who was married to Dorothea Elisabeth von Pfuel († 1740), daughter of General Georg Adam von Pfuel (1618–1672); grandmother of Adam Friedrich von Flemming, Chamberlain to Augustus II the Strong, and General Johann Georg von Flemming, Saxon electoral Chamberlain.
- Carl Ludwig von Pfuel (1725−1804), royal Prussian major general.
- Carl Ludwig Wilhelm August von Phull (1723–1793), general of the infantry, Kingdom of Württemberg; father of Lieutenant General Karl Ludwig von Phull (1757–1826)
- Catharina Elisabeth von Pfuel (1598–1636), Lady-in-waiting of Maria Eleonora of Sweden; wife of Johan Banér (1596–1641), Swedish field marshal in the Thirty Years' War. (see Friedrich Schiller: Wallenstein's Death); sister of Adam von Pfuel (1604–1659)
- Christian Friedrich von Pfuel (1653–1702), royal Prussian colonel, Lord of Gielsdorf, Wilkendorf and Jahnsfelde. Killed in action near Kaiserswerth during the War of the Spanish Succession.
- Christian-Friedrich von Pfuel, (born 1942), lawyer, protagonist in Sky du Monts 2003 novel Prinz und Paparazzi; grandson of Leo Geyr von Schweppenburg, General der Panzertruppe, commander-in-chief of Panzer Group West, as well as Inspector General of the Armoured Forces during World War II.
- Christian Ludwig von Pfuel (1696–1756), royal Prussian major general of the Infantry.
- Curt Christoph von Pfuel (died 1781), High Treasurer (Oberkämmerer) to the Elector of Saxony, highest Privy Councillor and General-War commissar.
- Curt-Christoph von Pfuel (1907–2000), Dr.jur., Prussian assessor, member of the Council of Europe, last Fideikommiss, Lord of Jahnsfelde. Married to Blanche Freiin Geyr von Schweppenburg; daughter of Leo Geyr von Schweppenburg. Character in Marie Vassiltchikov's Berlin Diaries, 1940-1945.
- Curt Wolf von Pfuel (1849–1936), royal Prussian general of the cavalry, first aide-de-camp to Wilhelm II, German Emperor, military attaché to Spain, inspector-general of Military education and training, chairman of the Central Committee of the German National Red Cross during World War I.
- Emil Karl von Pfuel (1821–1894), royal Prussian lieutenant general.
- Ernst von Pfuel (1609/10–1659), Doctor of Law, Imperial Count Palatine of Berlin, Advocate at the Kammergericht.
- Ernst von Pfuel (1779–1866), royal Prussian general of the infantry, governor of the Canton of Neuchâtel, Governor of Berlin, Cologne and the Prussian sector of Paris, member of the Prussian National Assembly, Prussian Minister of War as well as Prime Minister of Prussia.
- Ernst von Pfuhl (1768–1828), Minister of State of the Kingdom of Württemberg.
- Ernst Ludwig von Pfuhl (1716−1798), royal Prussian General of the Infantry, Governor of Spandau Citadel, Inspector-General of the Brandenburg Infantry.
- Frank (Francis) von Phul (1835–1922), captain of the Confederate States Army serving as a staff officer to the generals Lewis Henry Little, Daniel M. Frost, John Bullock Clark and John S. Marmaduke, as well as aide-de-camp of general Braxton Bragg.
- Franz Wilhelm von Pfuel (1733−1808), royal Prussian major general and commander of Danzig, later general in russian service.
- Friedrich von Pfuel (1462–1527), knight and electoral state-captain, as well as Privy Councillor to the Dukes of Mecklenburg.
- Friedrich August Heinrich Leberecht von Pfuhl (died 1818), royal Wurttembergian General of the Artillery (Generalfeldzeugmeister), Governor of Stuttgart.
- Friedrich Heino von Pfuel (1620–1661), Rittmeister, service at the royal Court of Christina, Queen of Sweden.
- Friedrich Heinrich Ludwig von Pfuel (1781–1846), royal Prussian lieutenant general, commanding officer of Saarlouis, as well as commanding officer of Spandau.
- Friedrich von Phull (Karl August Friedrich Freiherr von Phull; 1767–1840), general of the infantry, commander-in-chief of the Kingdom of Württemberg during the French Revolutionary Wars.

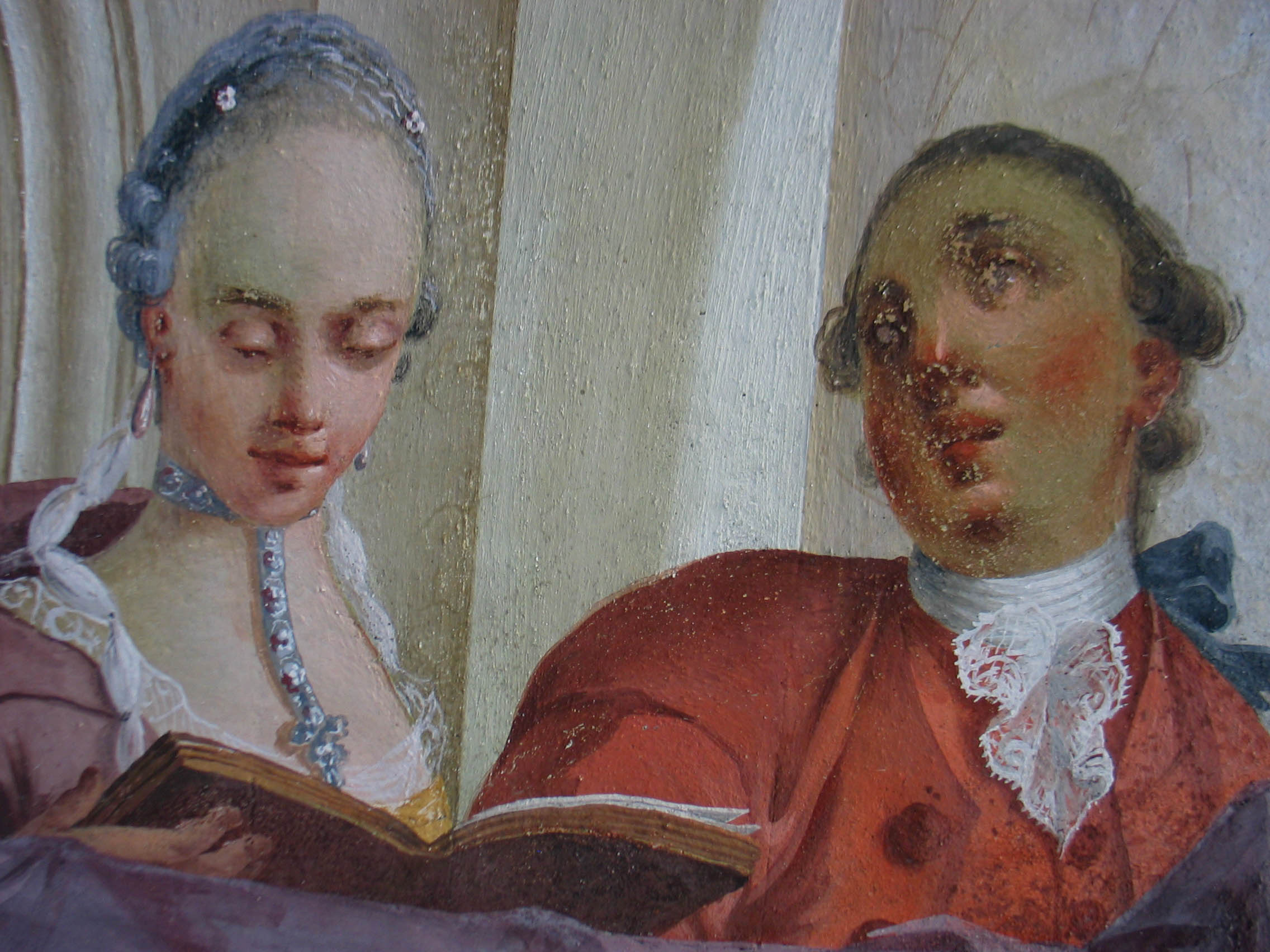
Ignatia Franziska von Pfuhl with her husband Klemens Karl von Freyberg; detail of a fresco by Joseph Keller, church of St. Moritz (Zell), Eisenberg, Bavaria

- Georg Adam von Pfuel (1618–1672), royal Prussian General of the Cavalry, Governor of Spandau Citadel, Lord of Groß- und Klein-Buckow (Märkische Schweiz).
- Georg Dietrich von Pfuhl (1723–1782), Royal Prussian colonel, commanding officer of the 13. Infantry Regiment, Knight of the Order of the Pour le Mérite (1762); married to Leopoldine Anne of Anhalt-Dessau (1738–1808), daughter of Prince William Gustav of Anhalt-Dessau, heir to the principality of Anhalt-Dessau and eldest son of Leopold I.
- George Ehrenreich von Pfuhl (born 1646), Landdrost of the Principality of Lippe, Lord of Helfta and Polleben.
- George von Phul Jones (1872–1968), American politician (Republican Party), Representative from Philadelphia County, Pennsylvania House of Representatives
- Gustav von Pfuel (1829–1897), Prussian Junker and politician, member of the Prussian House of Lords, father-in-law of Reichskanzler Theobald von Bethmann Hollweg. Senior civil servant of the Kingdom of Hanover; from 1868–1872 district president (Kreishauptmann) and Chief Constable of the district of Celle; Prefect of the department Seine-Maritime in Rouen, as well as Civil Commissioner (Zivilkommissar) of the departments Aisne and Ardennes during the Franco-Prussian War.
- Gustav Adolf von Pfuhl, member of the Fruitbearing Society.
- Gustav Adolph von Pfuel (1632–1683), Valet de chambre of William III of England; judge of Nödlitz
- Hans Emil Reinhold von Pfuel (* 1819), royal Prussian Chamberlain.
- Heino de Pule (1282–1307), hereditary Knight and Vogt in service to the Margraves of Brandenburg.
- Heino von Pfuel, in the year 1440 electoral Chancellor in service to Frederick of Altmark, Margrave of the Brandenburg, as well as to Frederick II, Elector of Brandenburg; Captain of Oderberg.
- Heino von Pfuel (1550–1602), electoral colonel appointed by John George, Prince-elector of Brandenburg.
- Hempo Ludwig von Pfuel (1690–1770), royal Prussian Privy Councillor and major, President of the Kriegs- u. Domänenkammer Halberstadt, Lord of Jahnsfelde.
- Henne de Pul, in the year 1337 Knight in the retinue of Louis IV, Holy Roman Emperor.
- Henne wan den Pule, in the year 1343 Dengesmann Advocatus.
- Henning von Pfuhl, Privy Councillor of Joachim II Hector, Elector of Brandenburg(1505–1571) and "known as a well-deserved hero".

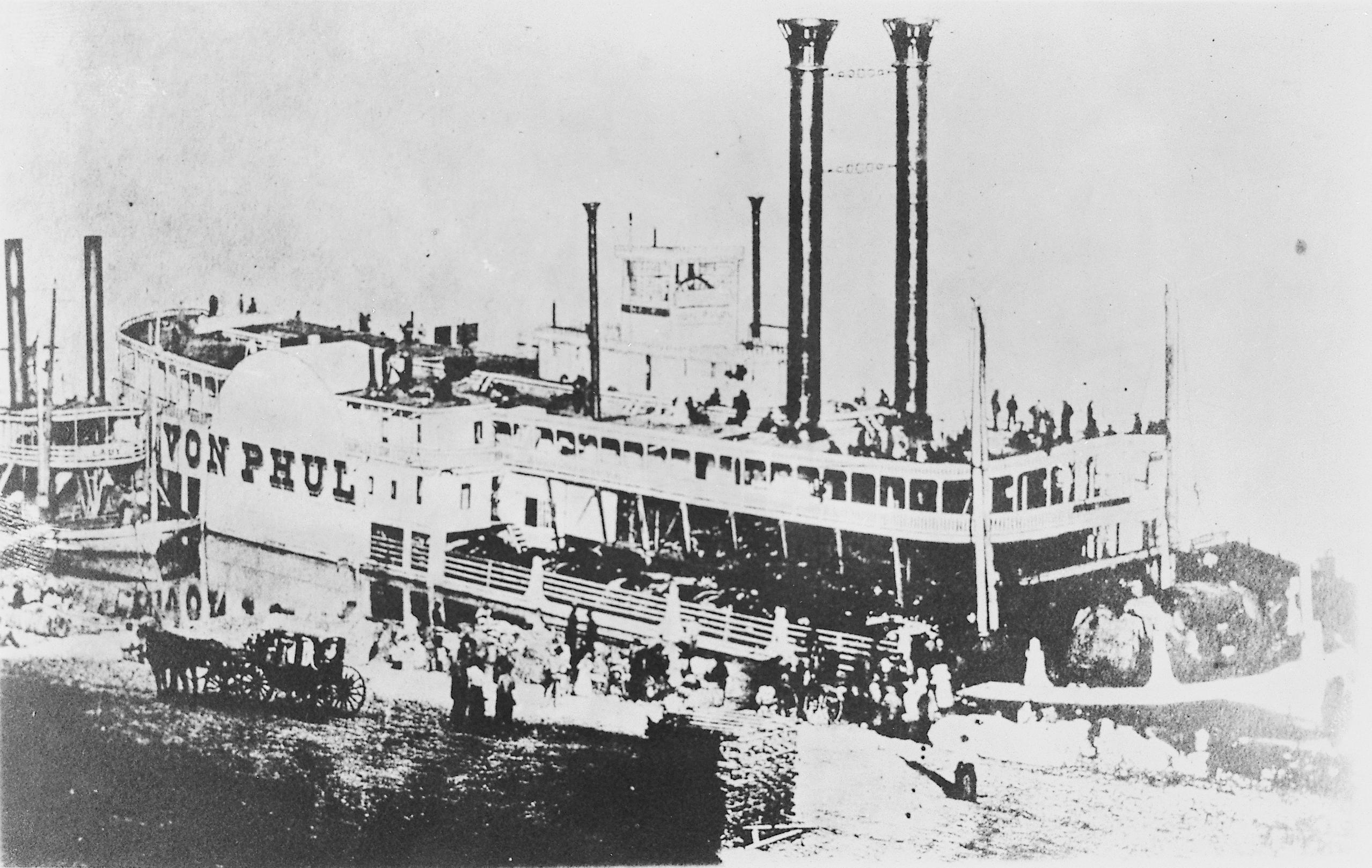
The Steamer Henry Von Phul (1860)

- Henry von Phul (1784–1874), American pioneer businessmen in St. Louis' early history; son of Johann Wilhelm von Phull (Phul) (1739–1793), Brother of Anna Maria von Phul (1786–1823), father of Frank (Francis) von Phul (1835–1922); von Phul married in 1816 Rosalie Saugrain (1797–1787), daughter of Antoine Saugrain (1763–1820)
- Heyno Dietloff von Pfuel (1652–1734), Dike-reeve of the Oderbruch.
- Hildbrandt von Pfuel, in the year 1260 mayor of Wismar.
- Johanna Christina von Pfuel (1675–1735), great-great-grandmother of Leopold, Grand Duke of Baden; great-grandmother of Louise Caroline of Hochberg, second wife of Charles Frederick, Grand Duke of Baden (see: Kaspar Hauser)
- Johann Ernst von Pfuel (1640–1705), Lutheran Doctor Theologiae, Prof. eloquentiae et poeseos in Greifswald, Rector of the "Fürstliche Pädagogium" Stettin, court chaplain to the Duke of Mecklenburg, member of the ecclesiastical council of Mecklenburg-Güstrow.
- Johann Gottlieb von Pfuel (1653–1681) Lieutenant colonel; Sohn des Adam von Pfuel (1604–1659)
- Juliane Sophie von Pfuel (1688–1749), great-grandmother of Reichskanzler Otto von Bismarck; married to Jobst Ernst von Schönfeld (1680–1725)
- Johann Wilhelm von Phull (1739-1793), Captain in general George Washington's staff, emigrated to America in 1764; father of the American artist Anna Maria von Phul (1786-1823) and Henry von Phul (1784-1974); son of Johann Phillip von Pfuel (1713-1748) and Wilhelmina Louisa von Hoff (1705-1780).
- Karl Ludwig von Phull (1757–1826), Prussian general who served as chief of the General Staff of King Frederick William III of Prussia in the Battle of Jena-Auerstedt. In Russian service, Phull successfully advocated for a scorched earth policy during Napoleon's invasion of Russia. Character in Leo Tolstoy's novel War and Peace.
- Kurt Bertram von Pfuel (1590–1658), statesman and politician. Valet de chambre to George William, Prince-elector of Brandenburg, General-War commissar and highest Privy Councillor to Frederick William I, Elector of Brandenburg – Duke of Prussia.
- Ludwig von Pfuel (1718−1789), royal Prussian major general und Hofmarschall to Frederick William I of Prussia.
- Ludwig Dietrich von Pfuhl (1669–1745), field marshal and commander of Kehl Fortress during the War of the Polish Succession; grandson of Adam von Pfuel (1604–1659).

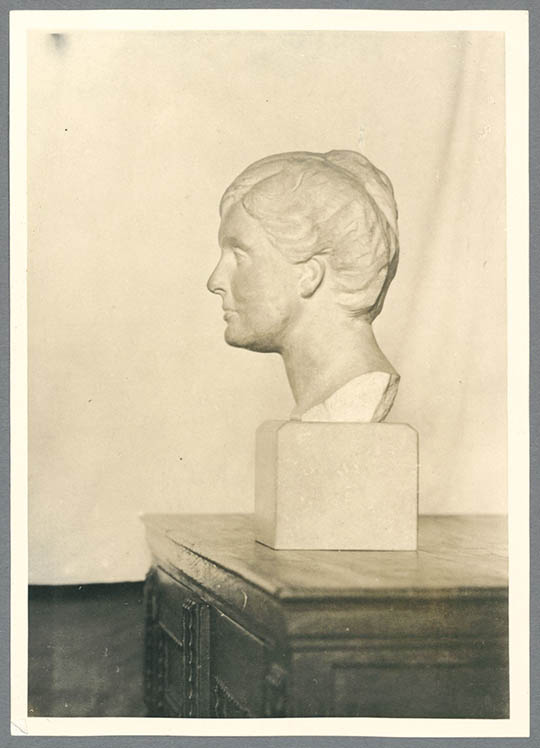
Martha von Pfuel, Georg Kolbe, 1910

- Martha von Pfuel (1865–1914), wife of Theobald von Bethmann Hollweg (1856–1921), German politician and statesman who served as Chancellor of the German Empire from 1909 to 1917.
- Maximilian von Pfuel (1854–1930), royal Prussian lieutenant general.
- Melchior von Pfuel (died 1548), "the Alchemist and Necromancer", Doctor of Law, electoral captain at Zossen, Chancellor and Privy Councillor to the Prince-elector of Brandenburg.
- Nickel von Pfuel (died 1492), Dr. iuris utriusque, Schloßhauptmann and Privy Councillor to the Prince-elector of Brandenburg, Knight and military commander, Vogt of Wriezen, judge at the Kammergericht, owner of Berlin castle.
- Otto-Friedrich von Pfuel (1731–1811), royal Prussian Haupt-Ritterschaftsdirektor.
- Richard Balduin Ernst von Pfuel (1827–1900), royal Prussian legation councilor, German Consul-General and Ambassador; 1872–1876 German Consul-General in Bucharest, 1876–1888 Imperial Ambassador at the Swedish royal court; Lord of Gielsdorf.
- Stephanie von Pfuel, née Michel von Tüßling (born 1961), mayor of Tüßling (CSU); daughter of Karl Freiherr Michel von Tüßling, Schutzstaffel (SS) officer who served in the Nazi government of German dictator Adolf Hitler, in the staff of Heinrich Himmler and the SS Main Office; ex-wife of Christian-Friedrich von Pfuel, (born 1942).
- Valtin von Pfuel (1587–1661), General-War commissar to the Prince-elector of Brandenburg, as well as High-Commissioner of the Barnim.
- Werner von Pfuel (died 1482), Hofmarschall to the princely court, later Vogt of Küstrin and Privy Councillor (Geheimrat) to the Prince-elector of Brandenburg, judge at the Royal Courts, Knight of the Dominican Order.
- Wolf Kurt von Pfuel (1809–1866), royal Prussian major general.
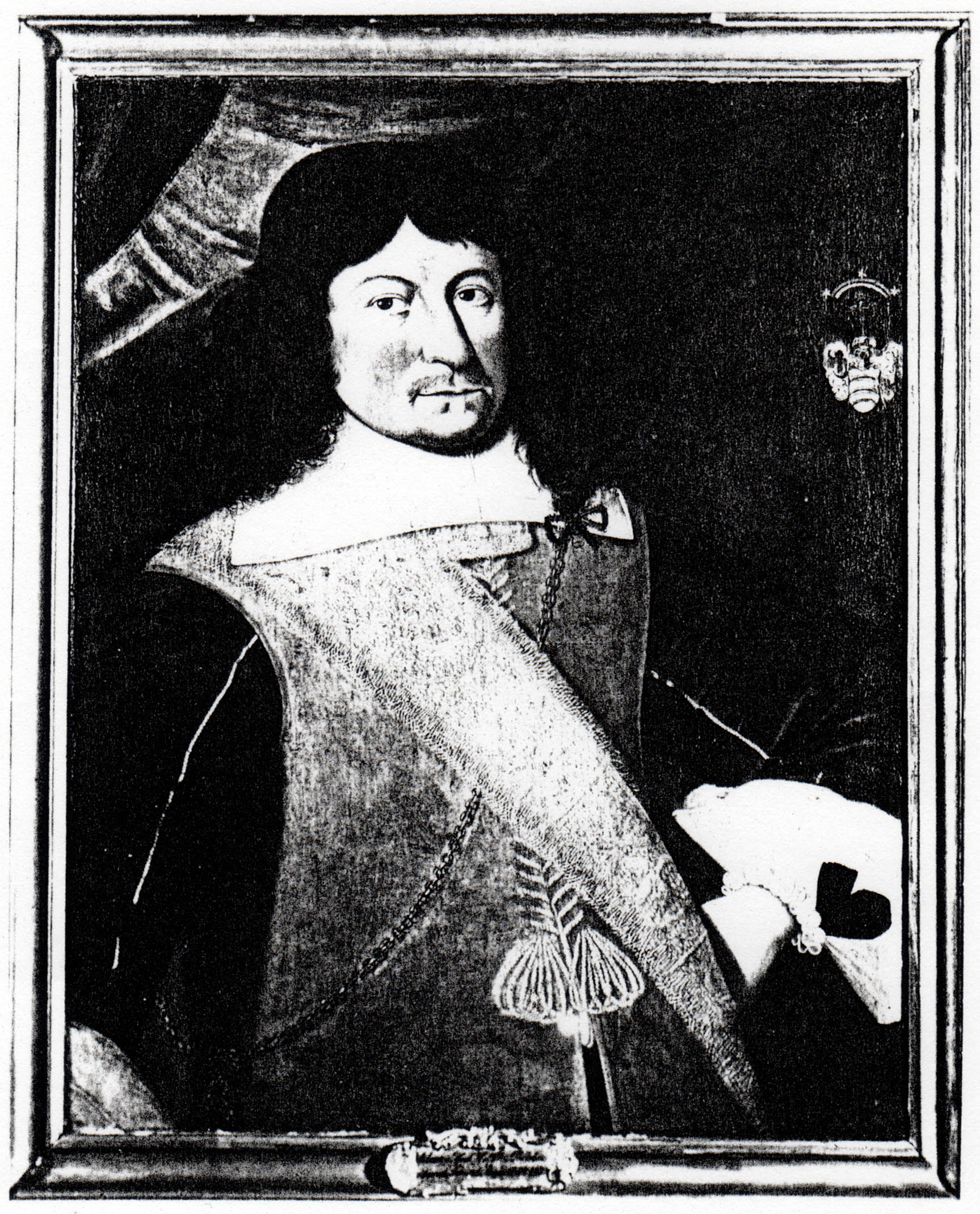
Adam von Pfuel (1604–1659)

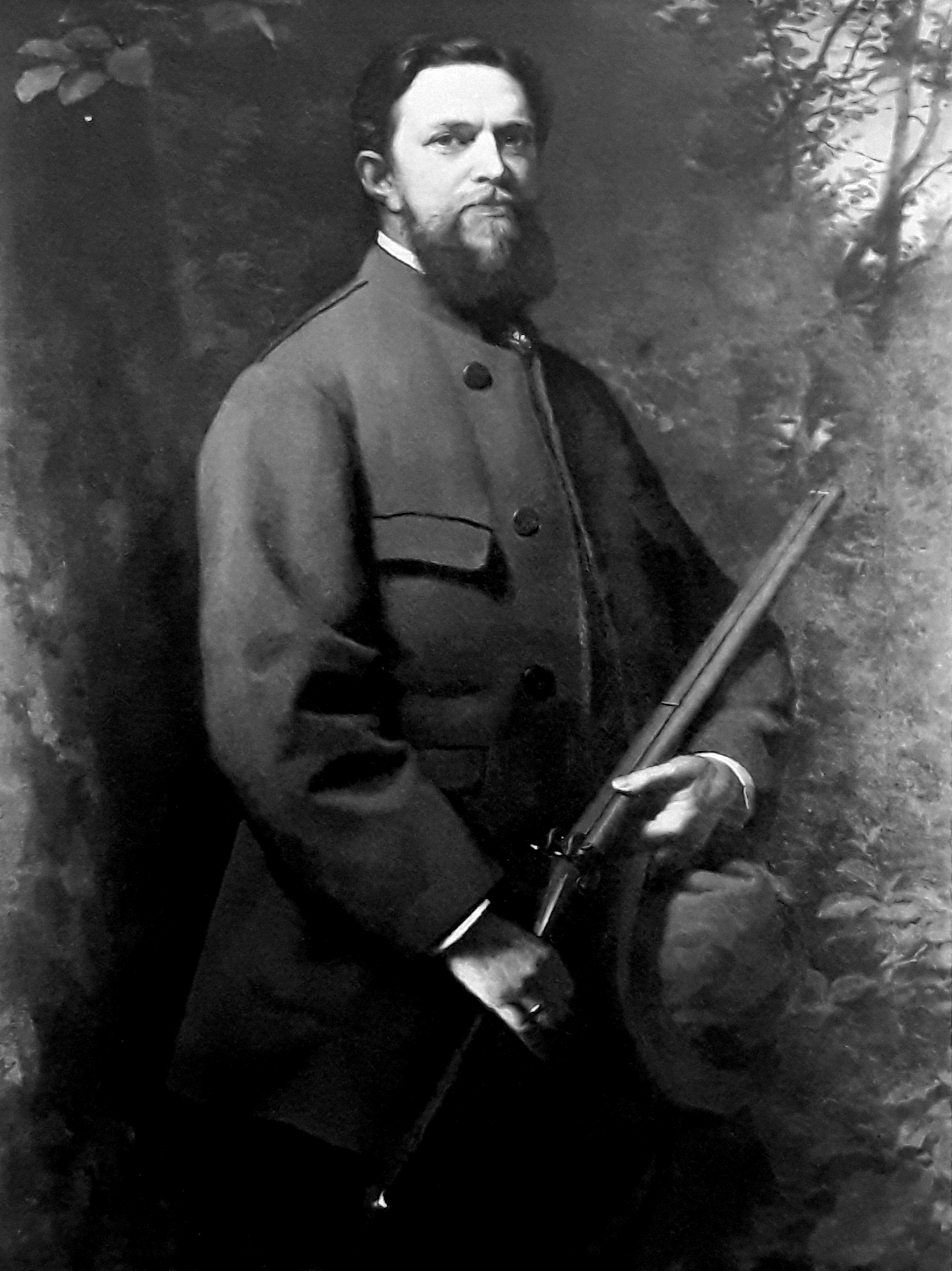
Alexander von Pfuel (1825–1898)

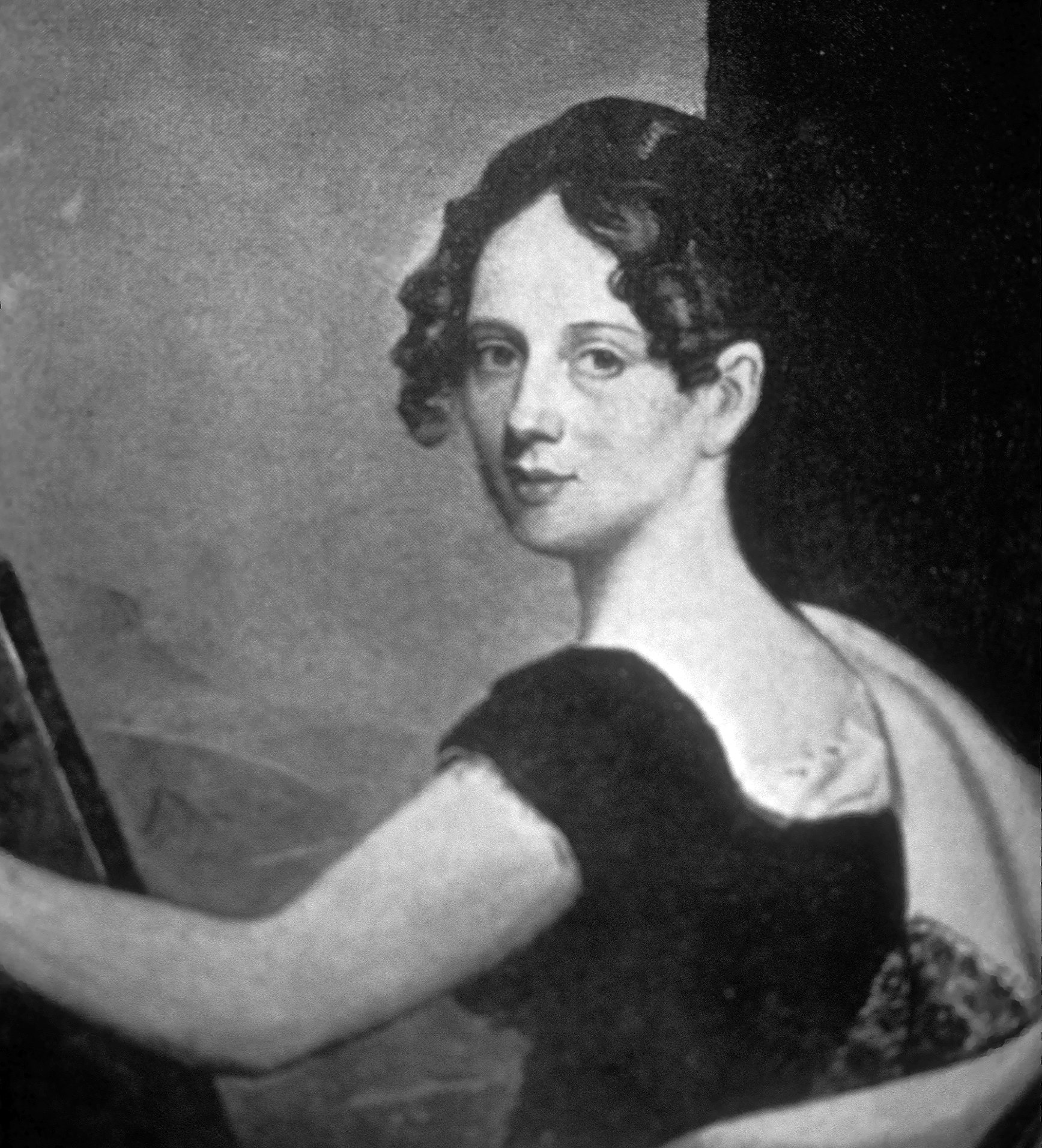
Anna Maria von Phul (1786–1823)

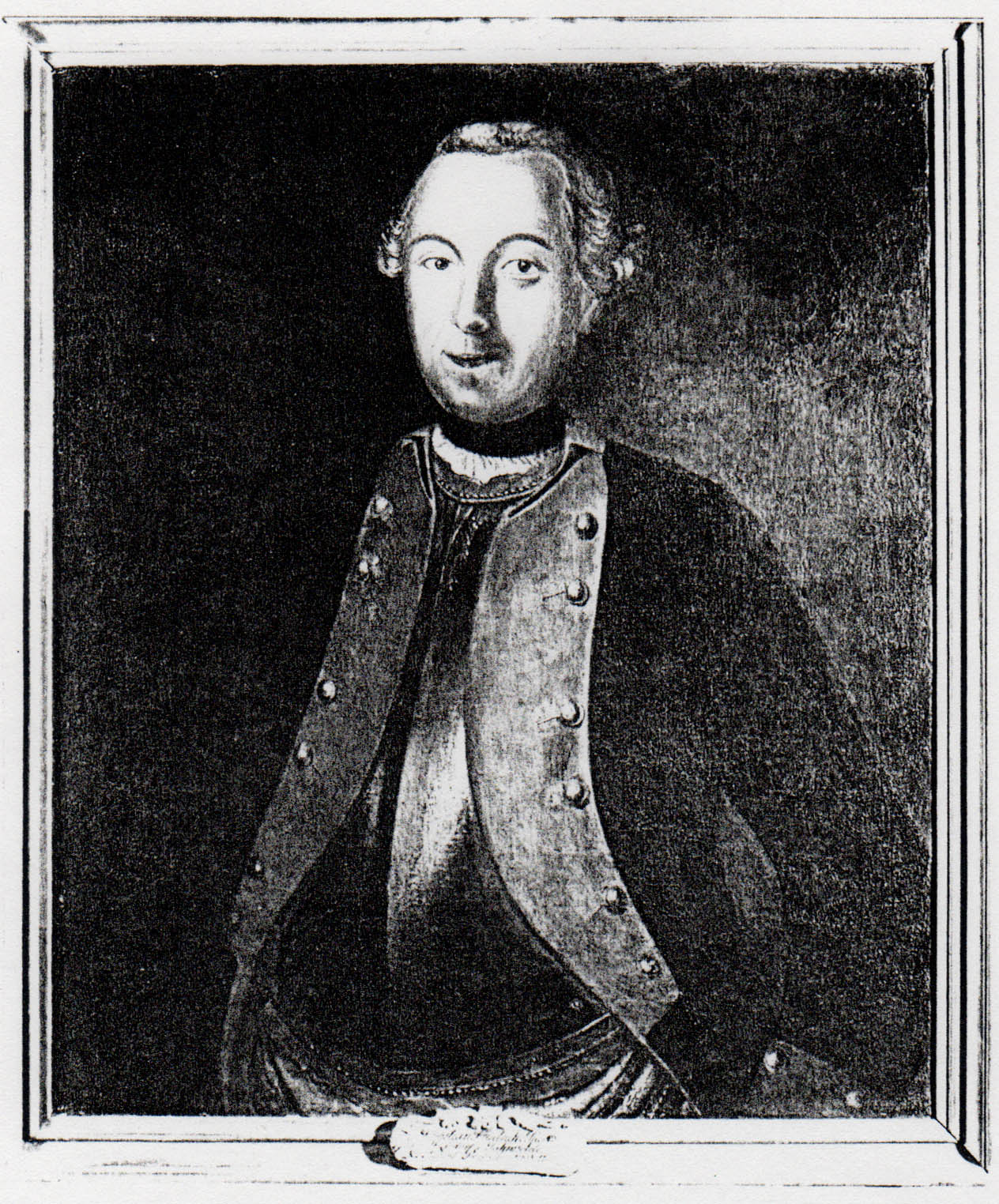
Christian Friedrich von Pfuel (1653–1702)

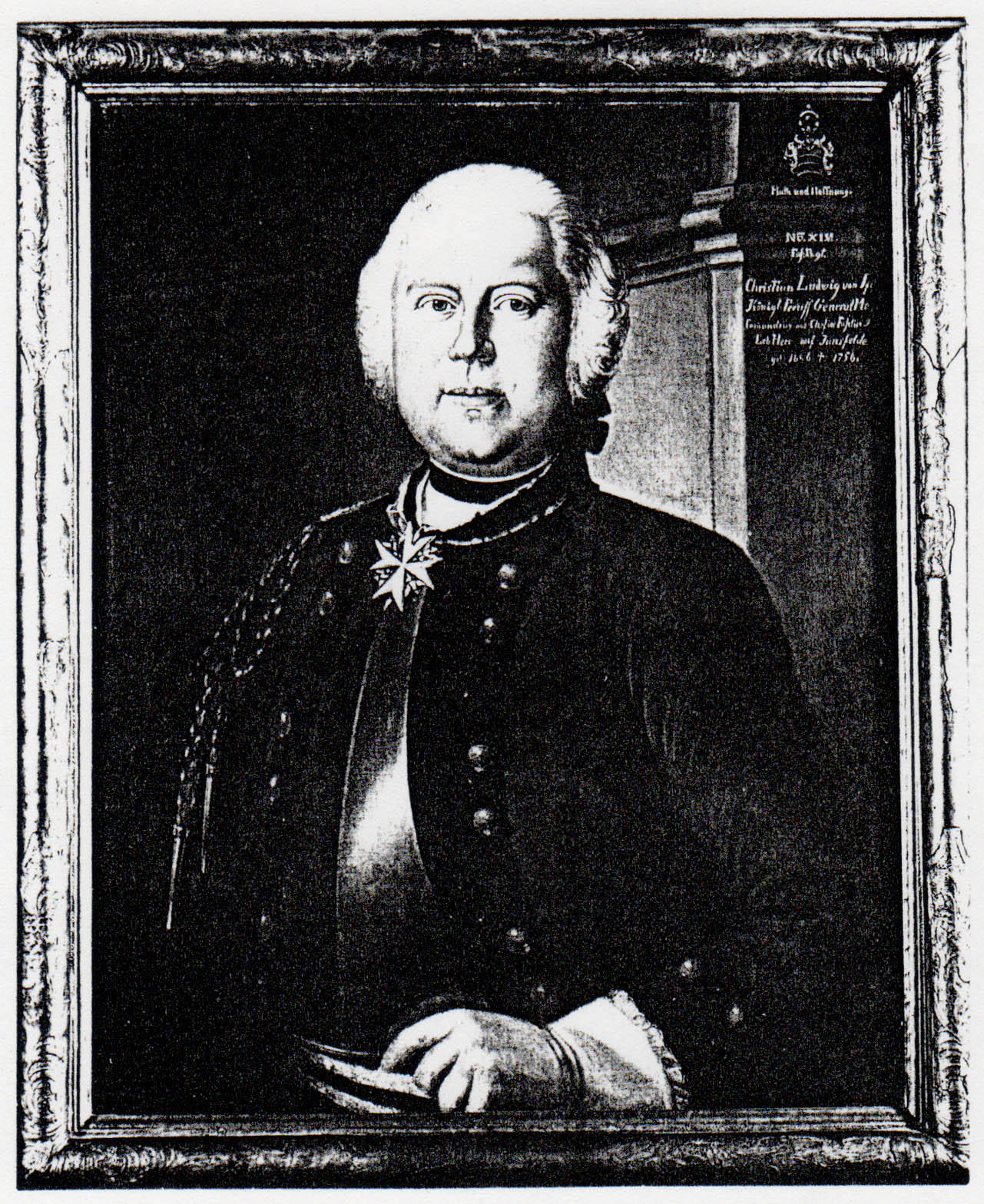
Christian Ludwig von Pfuel (1696–1756)

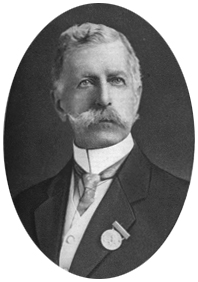
Curt von Pfuel (1849–1936)

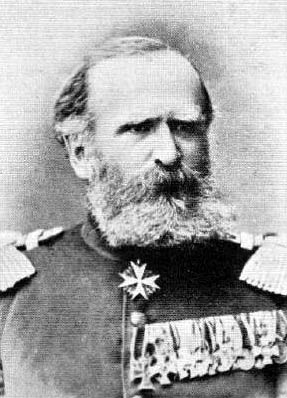
Emil von Pfuhl (1821–1894)

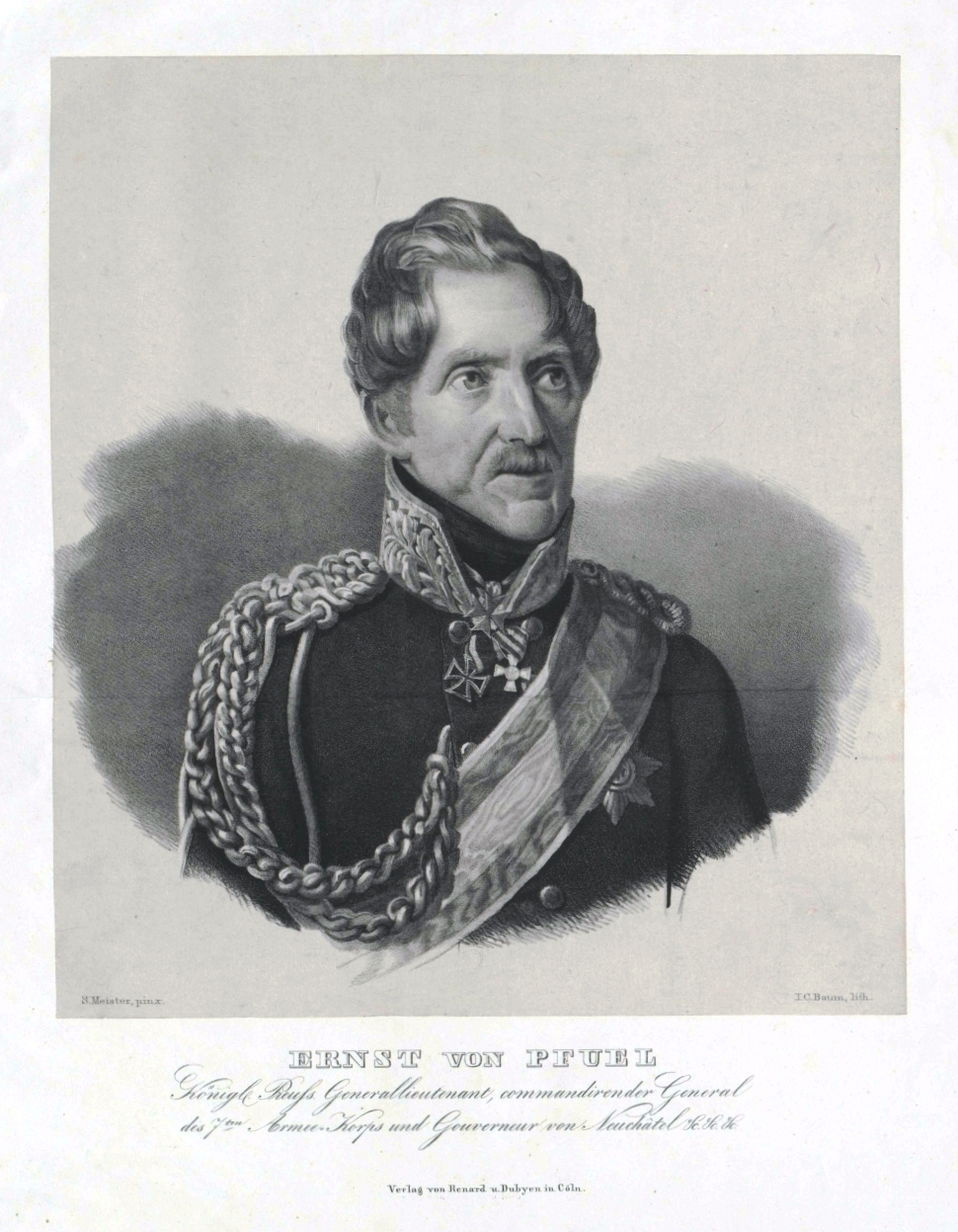
Ernst von Pfuel (1779–1866)

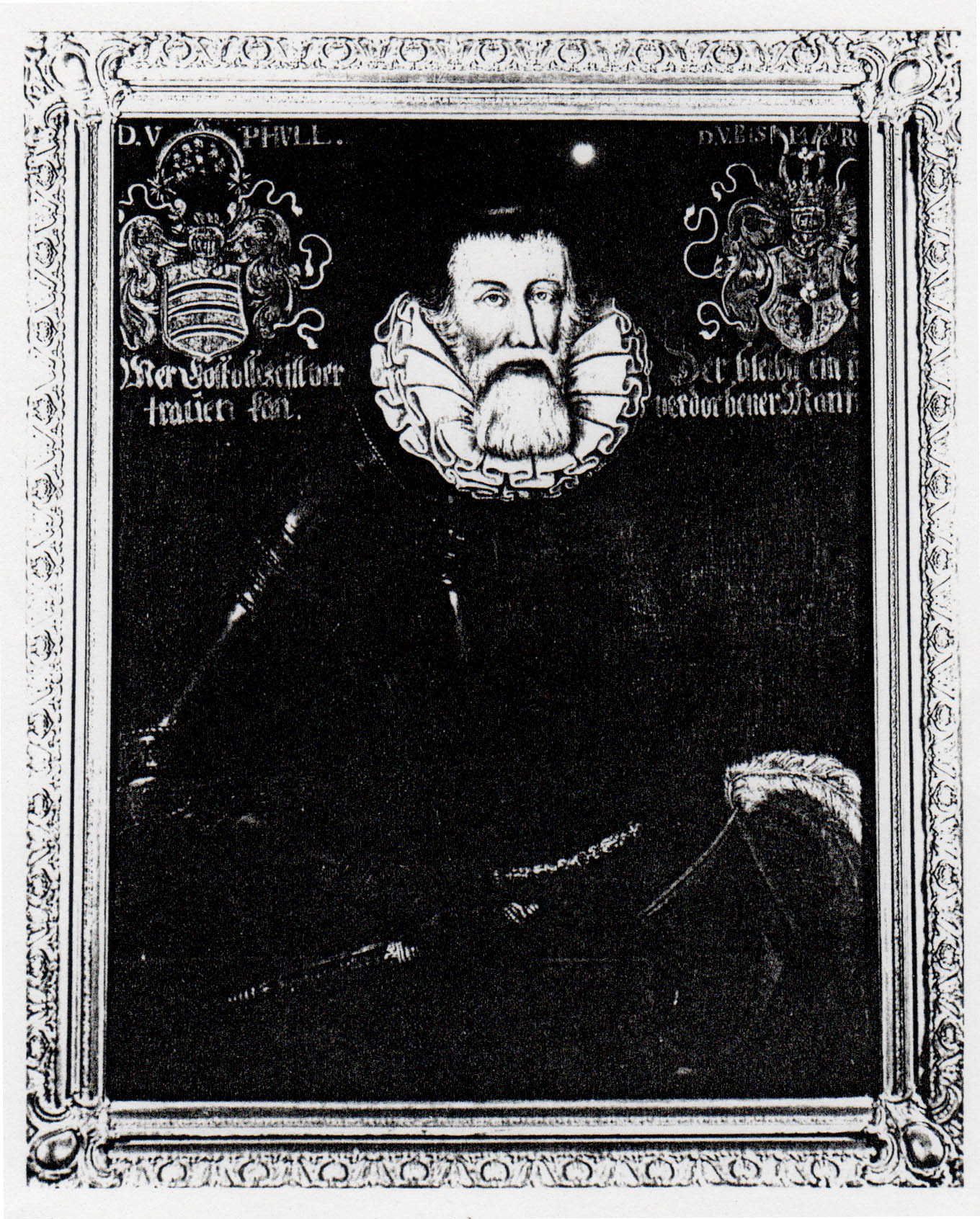
Ernst Friedrich von Pfuel (1548/49–1613)

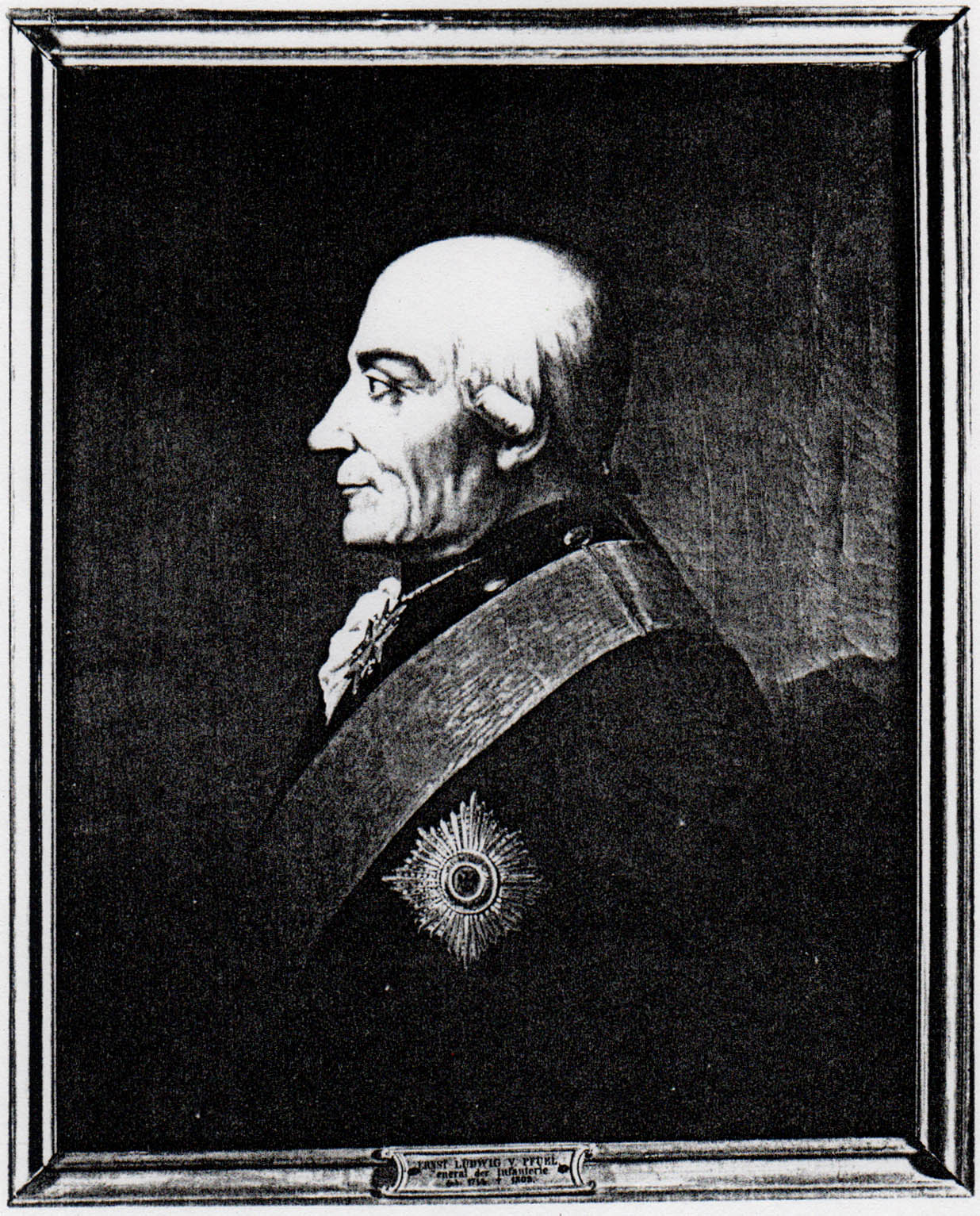
Ernst Ludwig von Pfuhl (1716−1798)

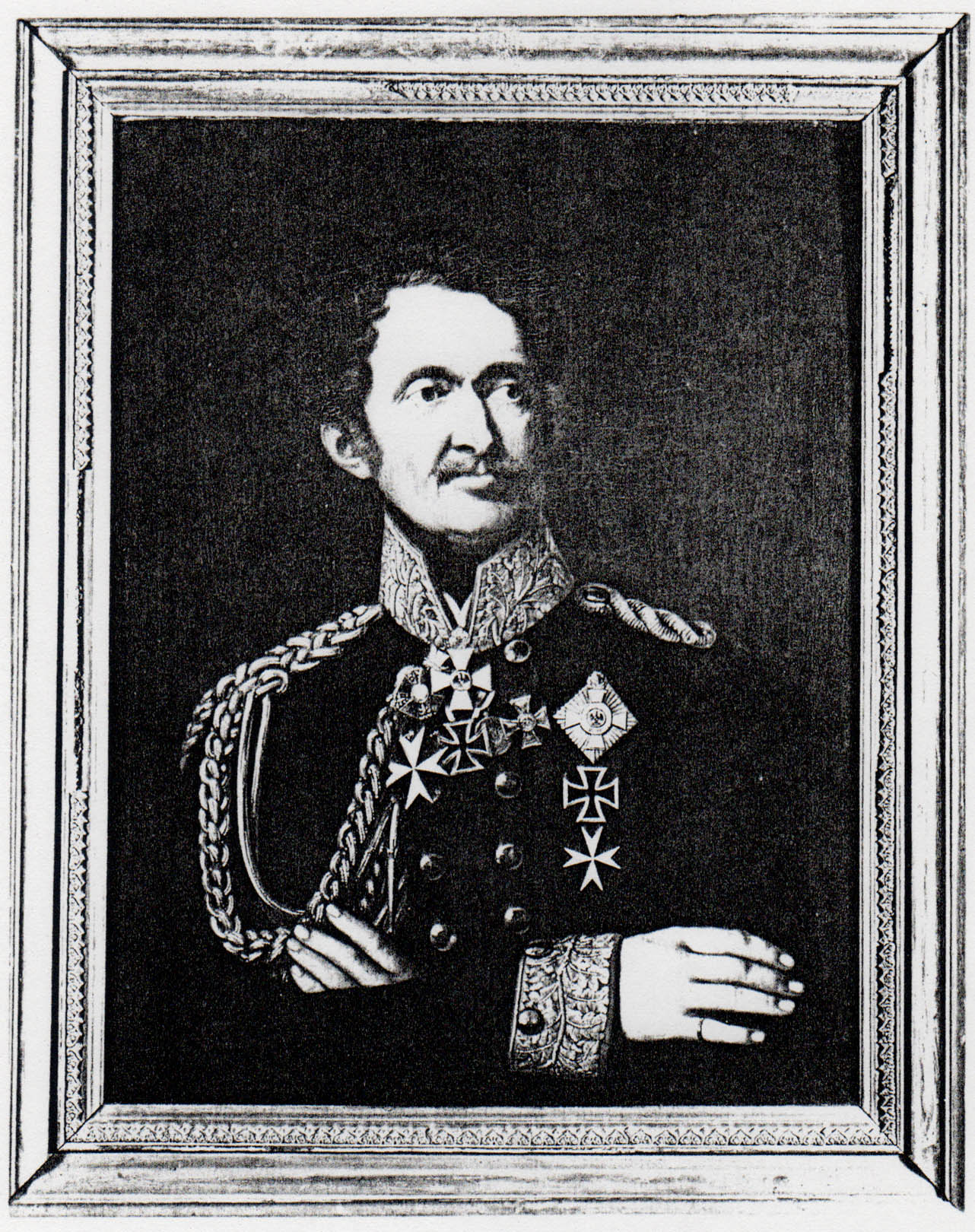
Friedrich Heinrich Ludwig von Pfuel (1781–1846)

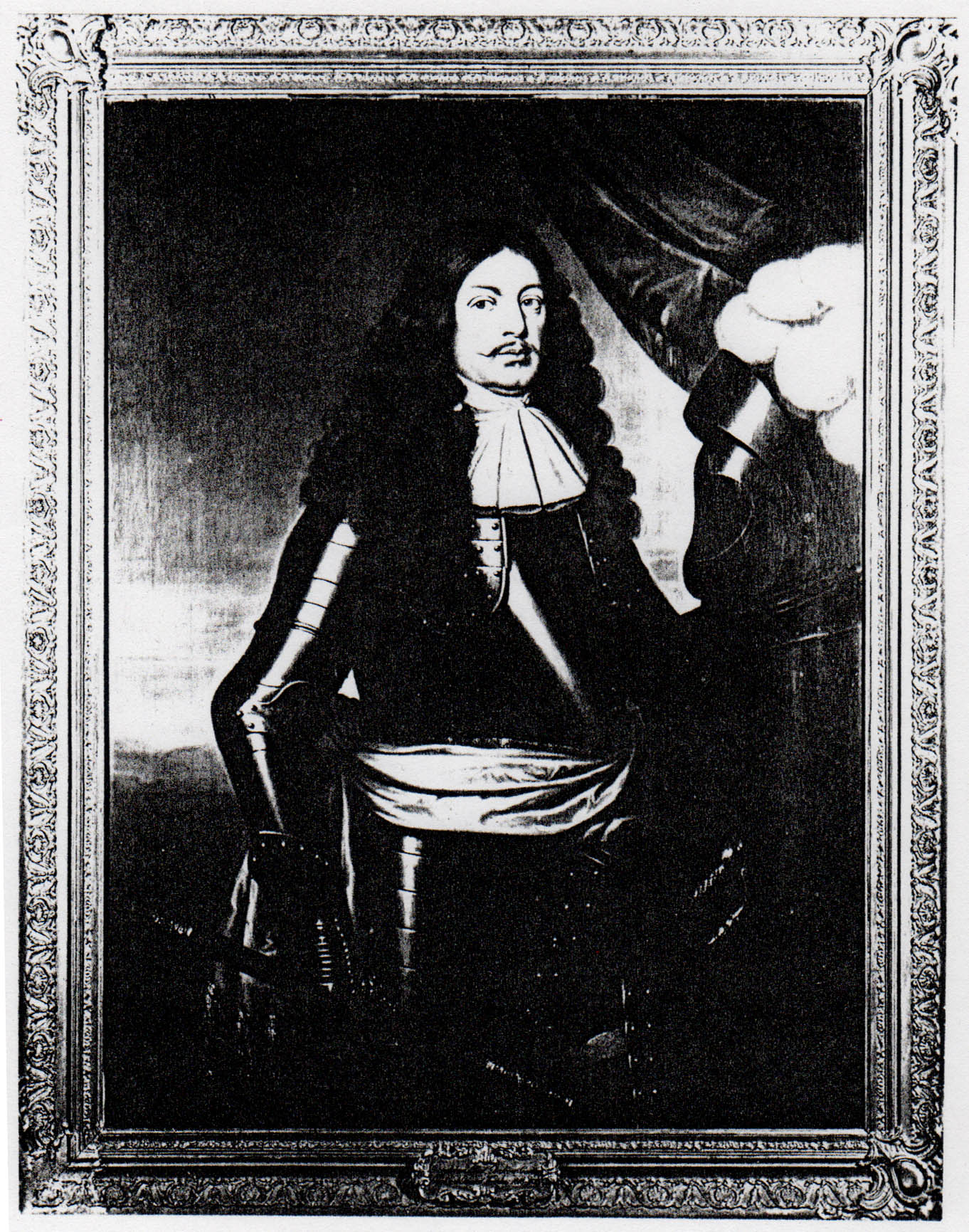
Georg Adam von Pfuhl (1618–1672)

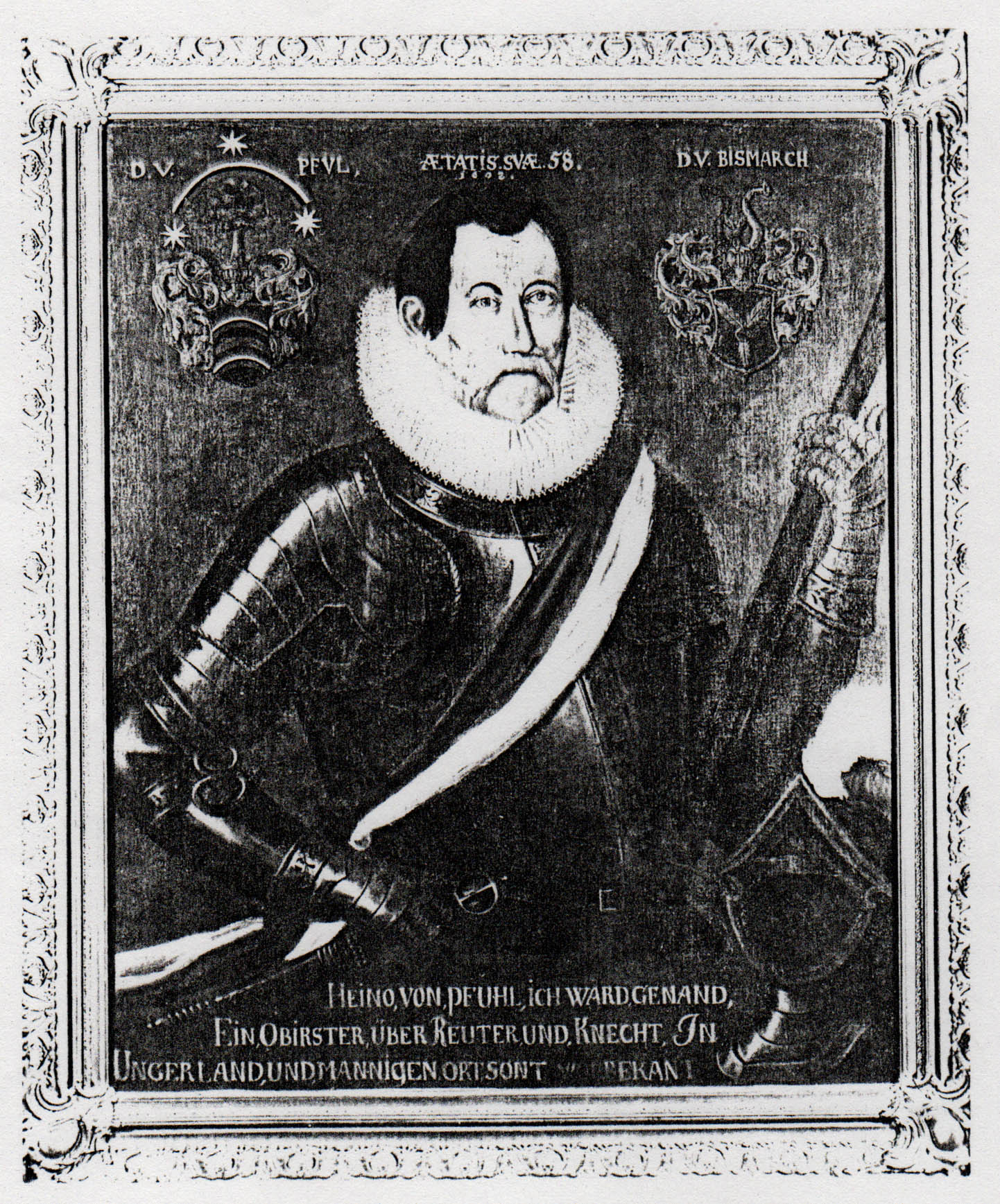
Heino von Pfuel (1550–1602)

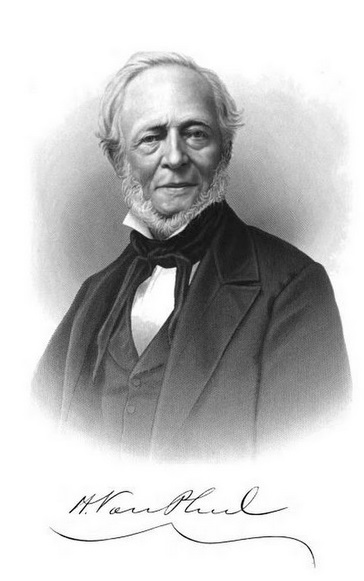
Henry von Phul (1784–1874)

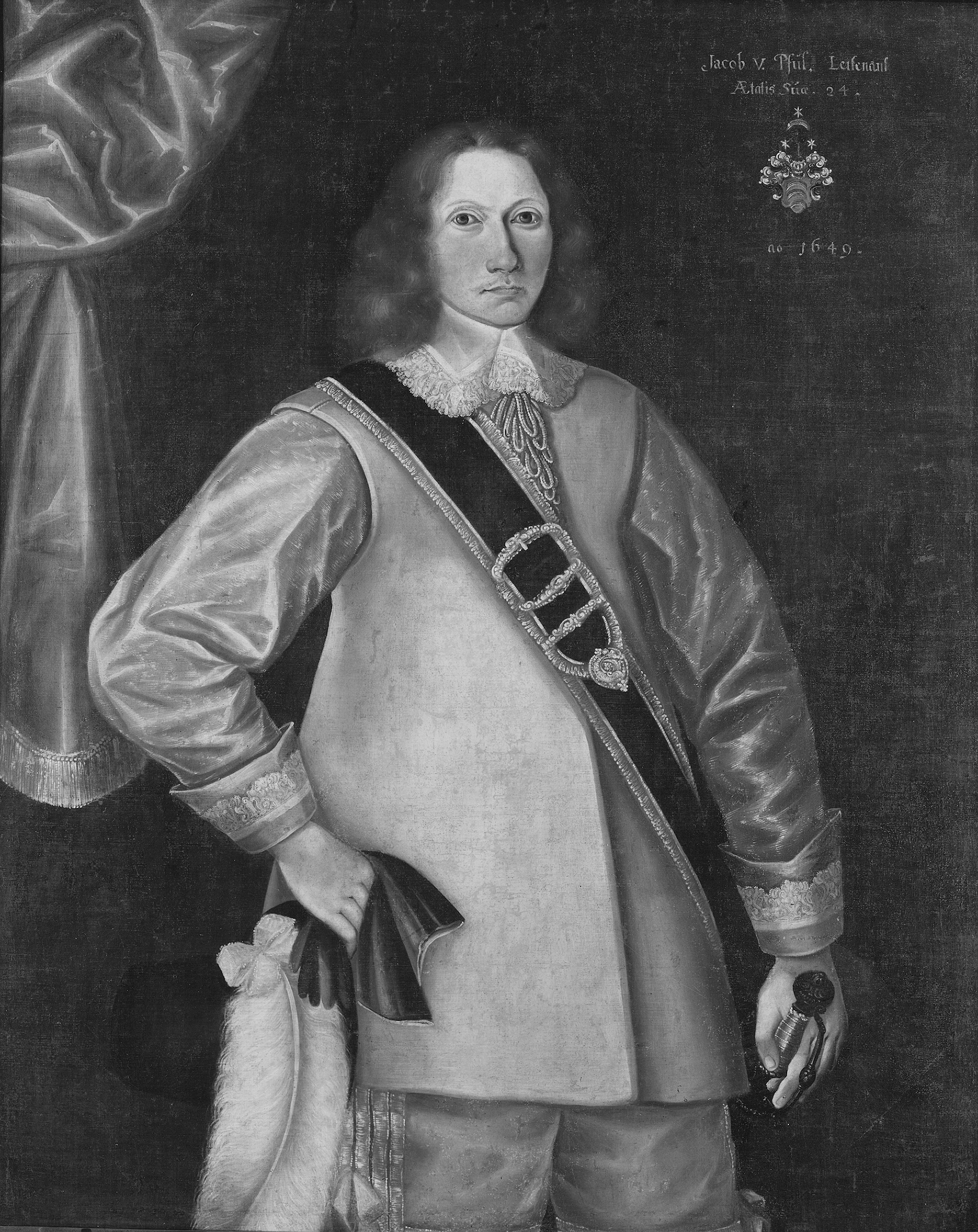
Jacob von Pfuel (1621–1704)

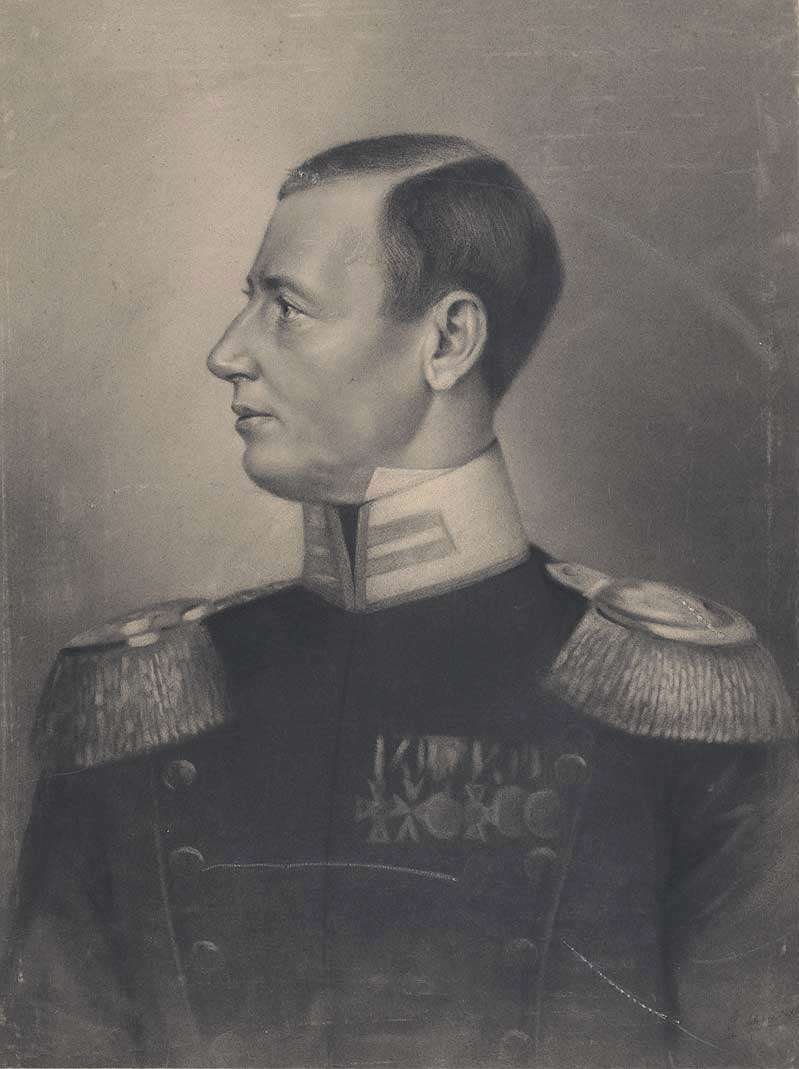
Karl Ludwig von Phull (1757–1826)

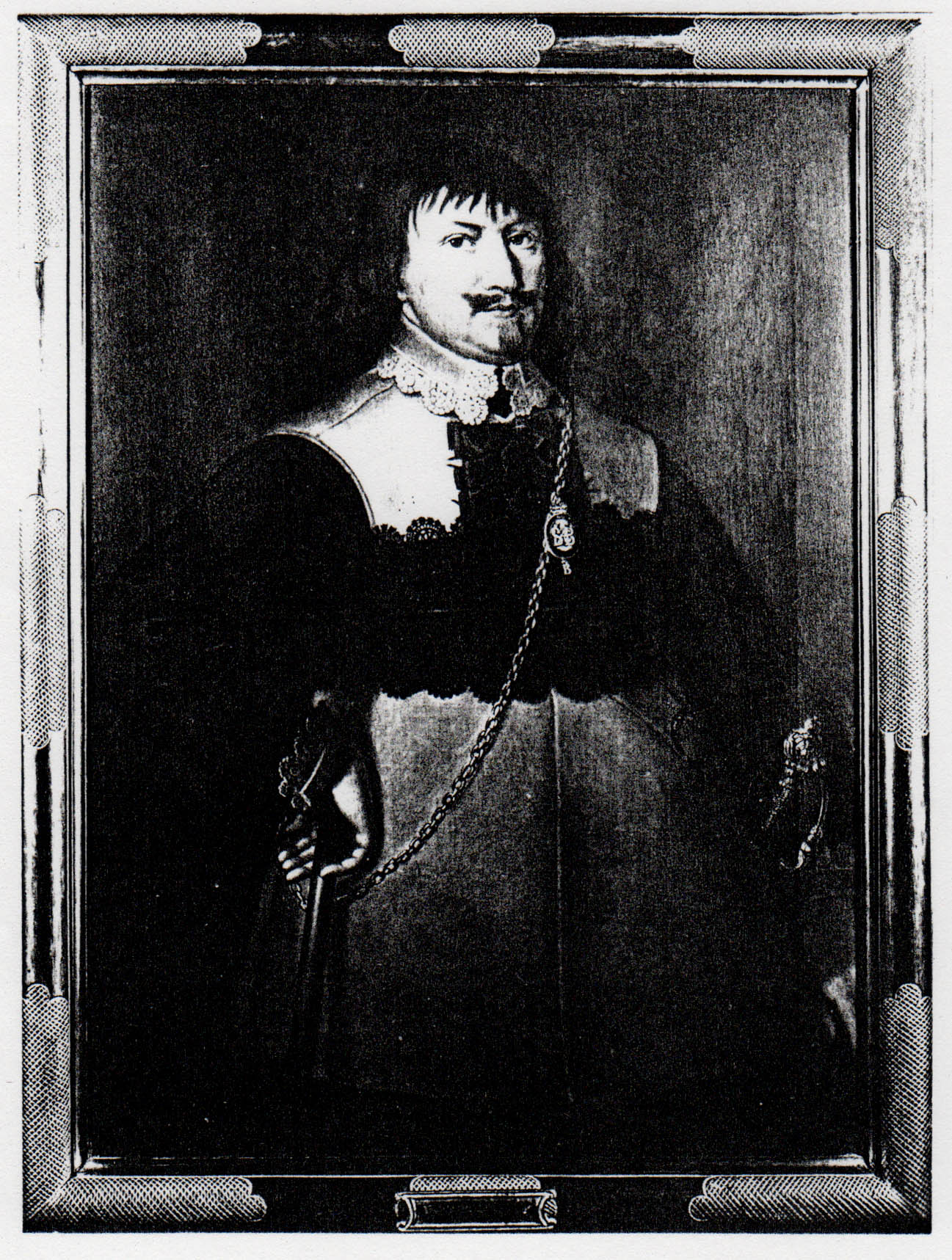
Kurt Bertram von Pfuel (1590–1658)

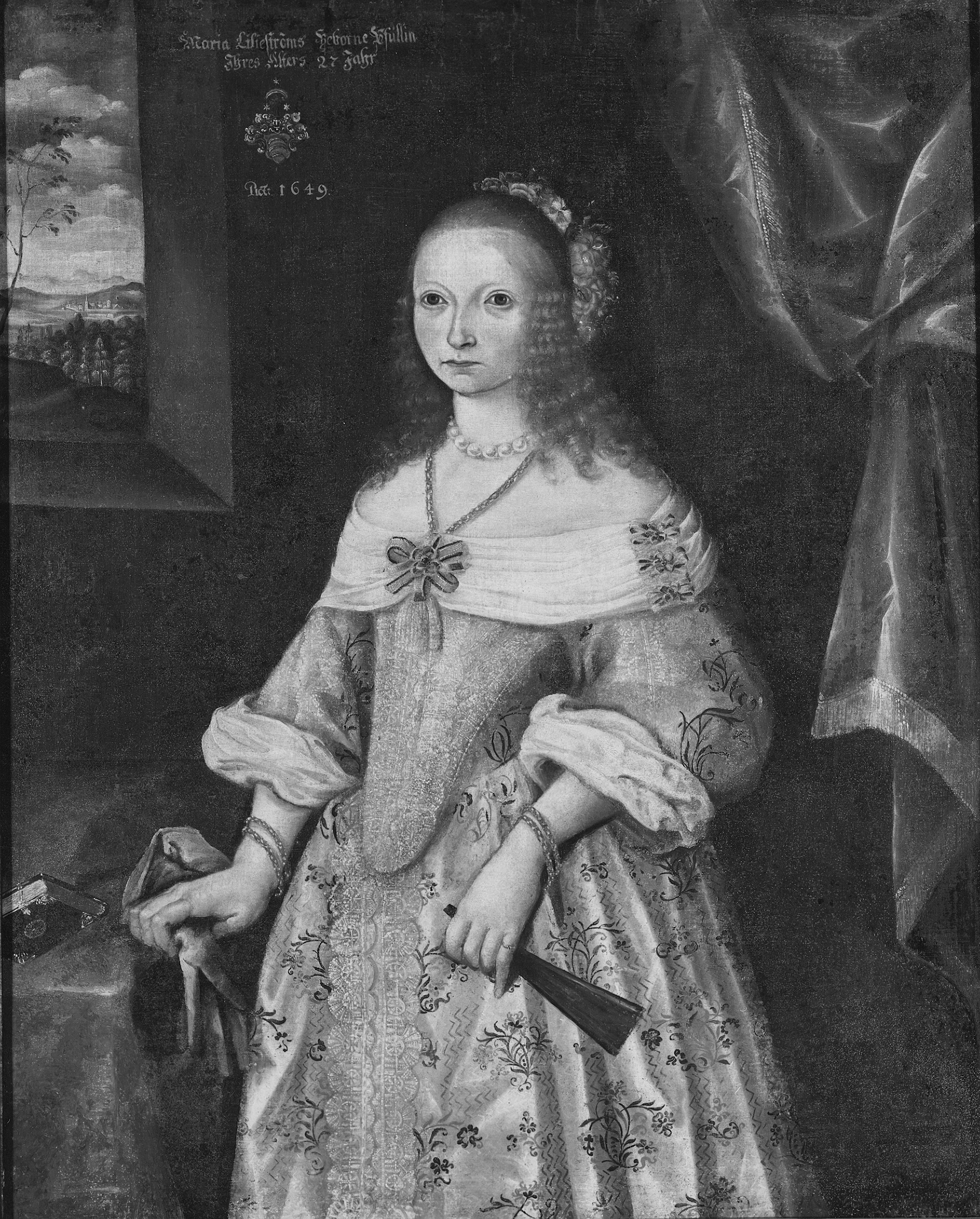
Maria von Pfuel (1622−1697)

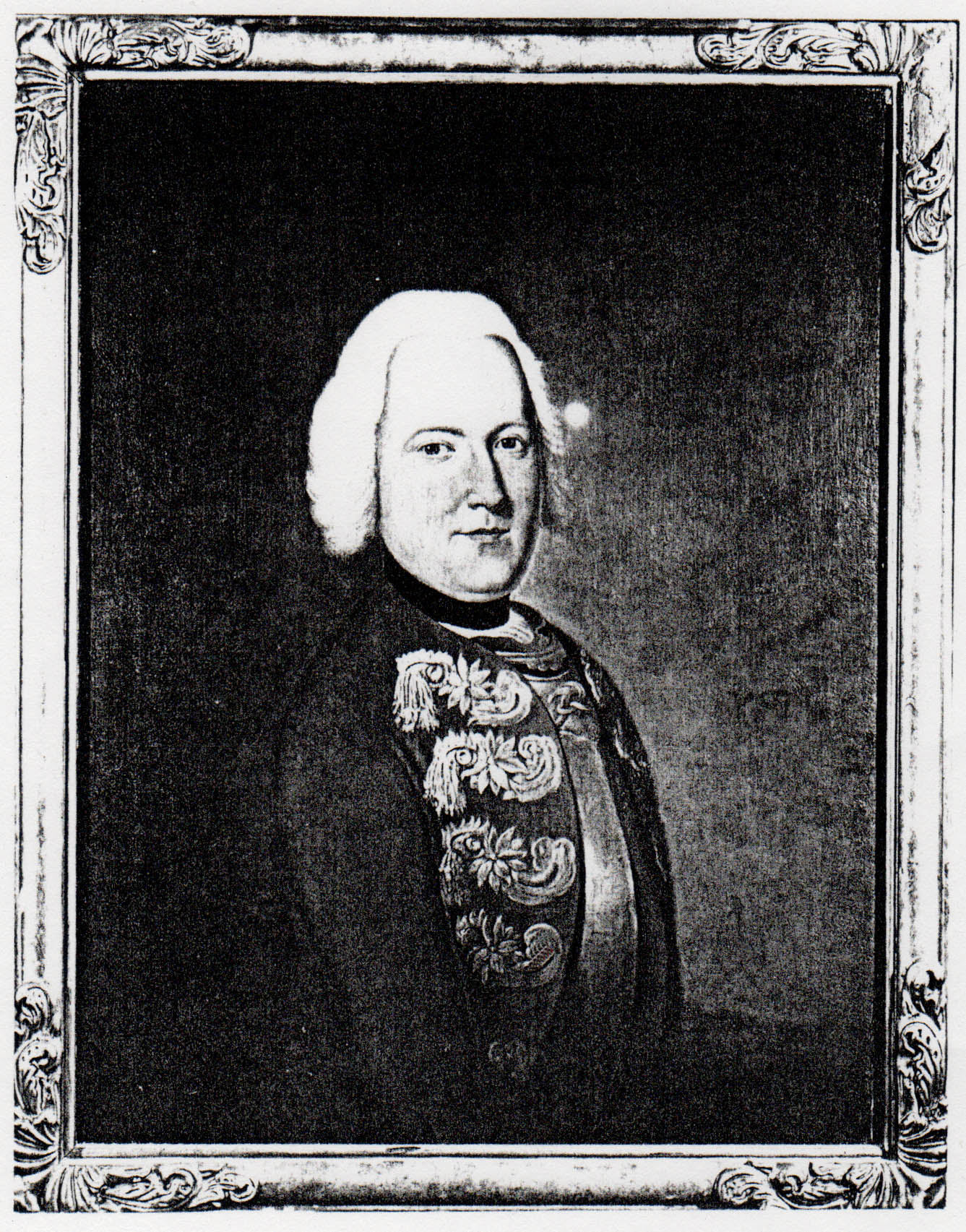
Ludwig von Pfuel (1718−1789)

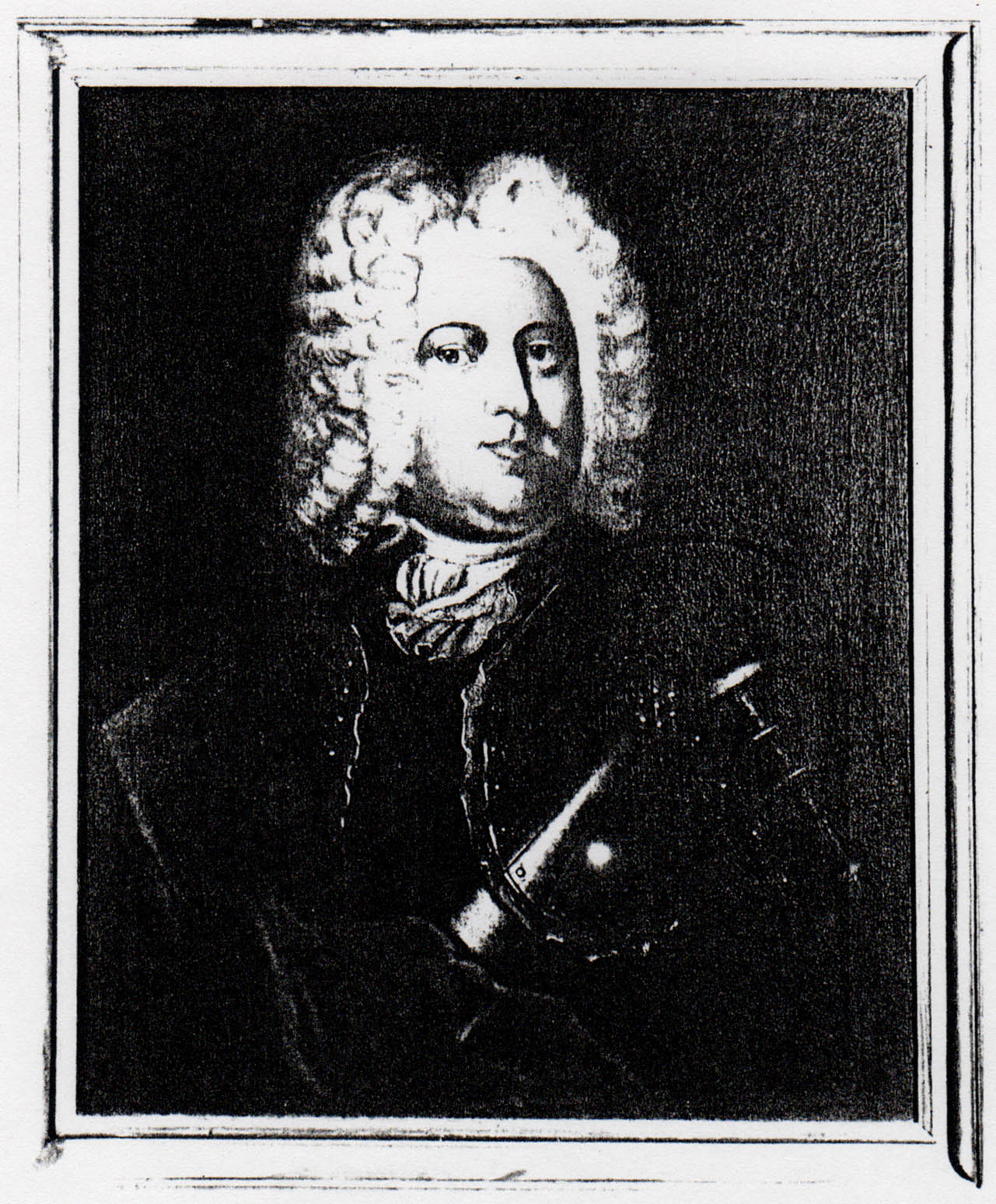

== Literature ==
- Genealogisches Handbuch des Adels, Adelslexikon Band X, pp. 336f., Band 119, C. A. Starke, Limburg (Lahn) 1999, ISBN 3-7980-0819-1
- Bernhard von Gersdorff: Preußische Köpfe – Ernst von Pfuel. Stappverlag, 1981, ISBN 3-87776-154-2
- Stephanie von Pfuel: Wenn schon, denn schon. LangenMüller, 2007, ISBN 978-3-7844-3115-4
- Marco Schulz: Jahnsfelde Schlösser und Gärten der Mark. Freundeskreis Schlösser und Gärten der Mark, Sibylle Badstübner-Gröger (Publisher). ISBN 978-3-941675-00-1
