= Henry von Phul =

American businessman (1784–1874)

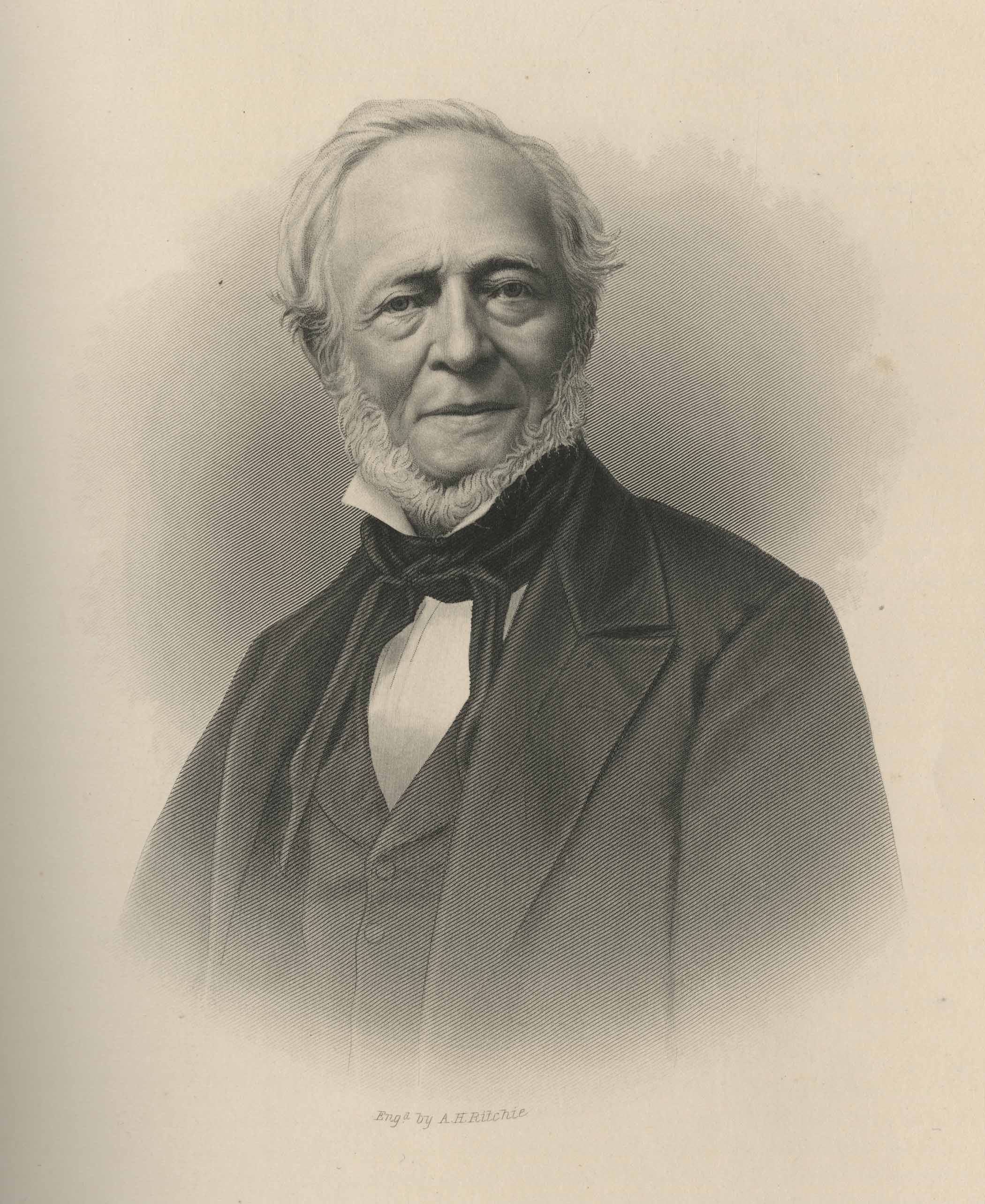
- Born: August 14, 1784; Philadelphia, Pennsylvania, U.S.
- Died: September 8, 1874 (aged 90); St. Louis, Missouri, U.S.
- Resting place: Calvary Cemetery, St. Louis
- Spouse: Rosalie Genevieve Saugrain (m. 1816)
- Relatives: Anna Maria von Phul (sister)
- Military career
- Branch: Missouri Rangers
- Conflicts: American Indian Wars; War of 1812

Henry von Phul (August 14, 1784 – September 8, 1874) was an American pioneer merchant, businessman and public official whose career coincided with the growth of the city of St. Louis, Missouri, between 1811 and 1874.

== Origins ==
Henry von Phul was the son of Johann Wilhelm von Phull (later William von Phul), who was born at Westhofen, in Central Pfalz, on November 14, 1739, and came to North America in 1764, settling in Lancaster, Pennsylvania, where he was married to Catharine Graff on November 14, 1775. Both belonged to the Moravian Church, and it is possible that von Phul had left Germany for religious reasons. The marriage was happy, and the fruits of it were George, Catharine, William, Sarah, Henry, Anna Maria, Philip and Graff von Phul.

== Early life ==
Henry was born on August 14, 1784, in Philadelphia, where in 1792, his father and several siblings died from the yellow fever that was fatally epidemic there during that year. In 1800, when he was the only support of his aged mother and two sisters, he moved to Lexington, Kentucky, where he resided for ten years, in the employ of Thomas Hart, Jun., brother-in-law of Henry Clay, and after whose father Thomas H. Benton was named. In the interest of Hart, young von Phul made numerous trips to the South, having in charge keel-boats loaded with flour, lead, bagging and rope. Stopping at the principal towns on the Mississippi River, he would dispose of his merchandise, taking In exchange cotton, which he would take to New Orleans and sell, as well as the keel-boats. He would then return on horseback to Lexington, where he would make up another shipment of whatever wares his customers wanted.

== Move to St. Louis ==
At that time, St. Louis was attracting attention as a business point, and not finding Lexington as rapidly advancing in population and business as he wished, von Phul started for the new city in 1811, feeling confident that from the position it occupied, it must in time become a place of importance. On arriving, he found St. Louis a settlement of eleven or twelve hundred inhabitants, most of whom were French and engaged principally in dealing in lead and peltries.

=== War of 1812 ===
At that time, all the country west of St. Louis and on the Illinois side of the Mississippi River was still unsettled, and the American Indians who lived there often came into conflict with the white settlers. In 1812, von Phul joined the Missouri Rangers and enlisted in a company of volunteers commanded by Nathan Boone, son of Daniel Boone, the Kentucky pioneer, and with them hastened to the relief of the settlers on the Missouri River, who were attacked by bands of Indians. During the War of 1812, he made several trips on horseback between St. Louis and Louisville.

== Success in St. Louis ==
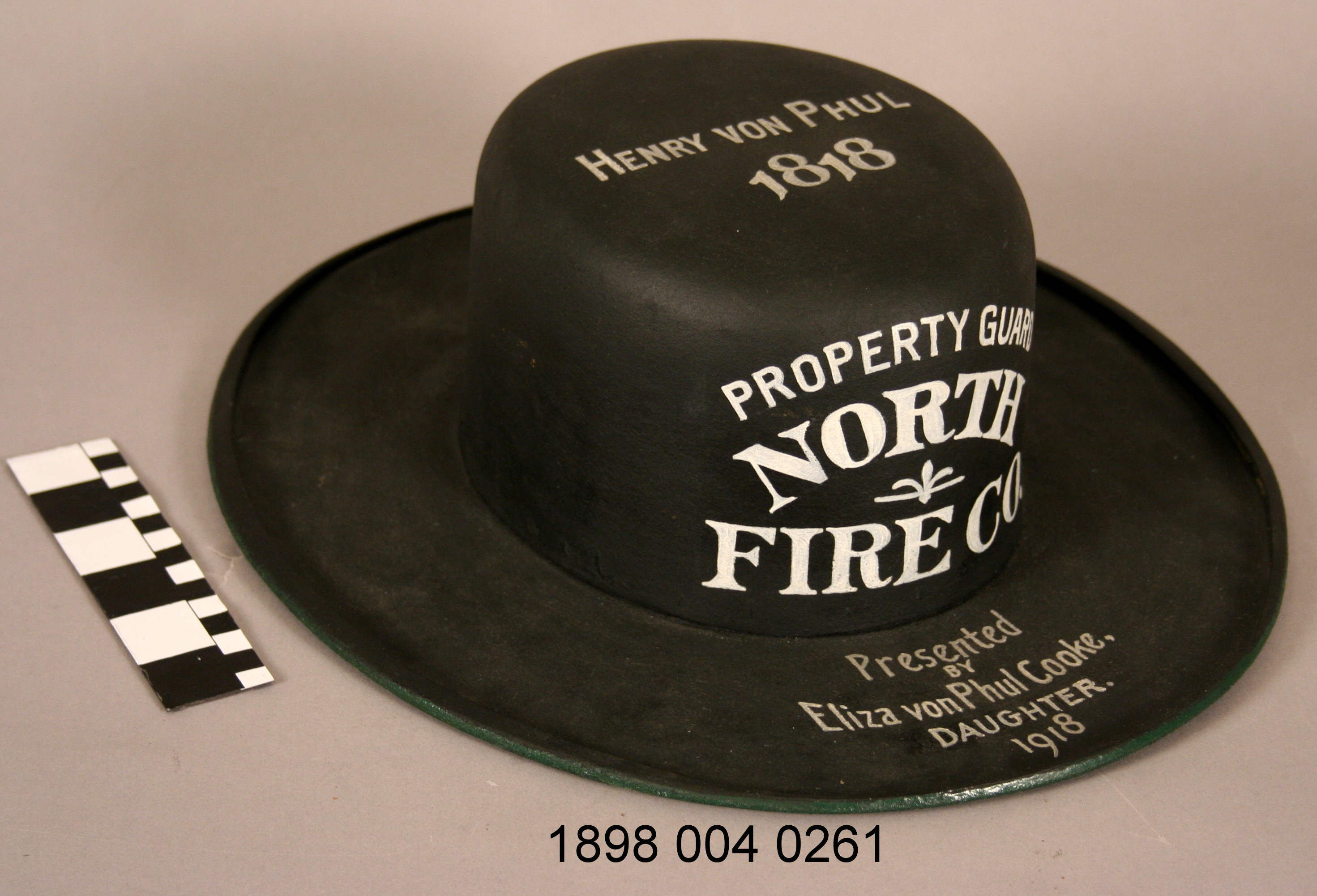
Black painted felt fire hat worn by Henry von Phul of North Fire Co. and Union Fire Co. No. 2 in 1819

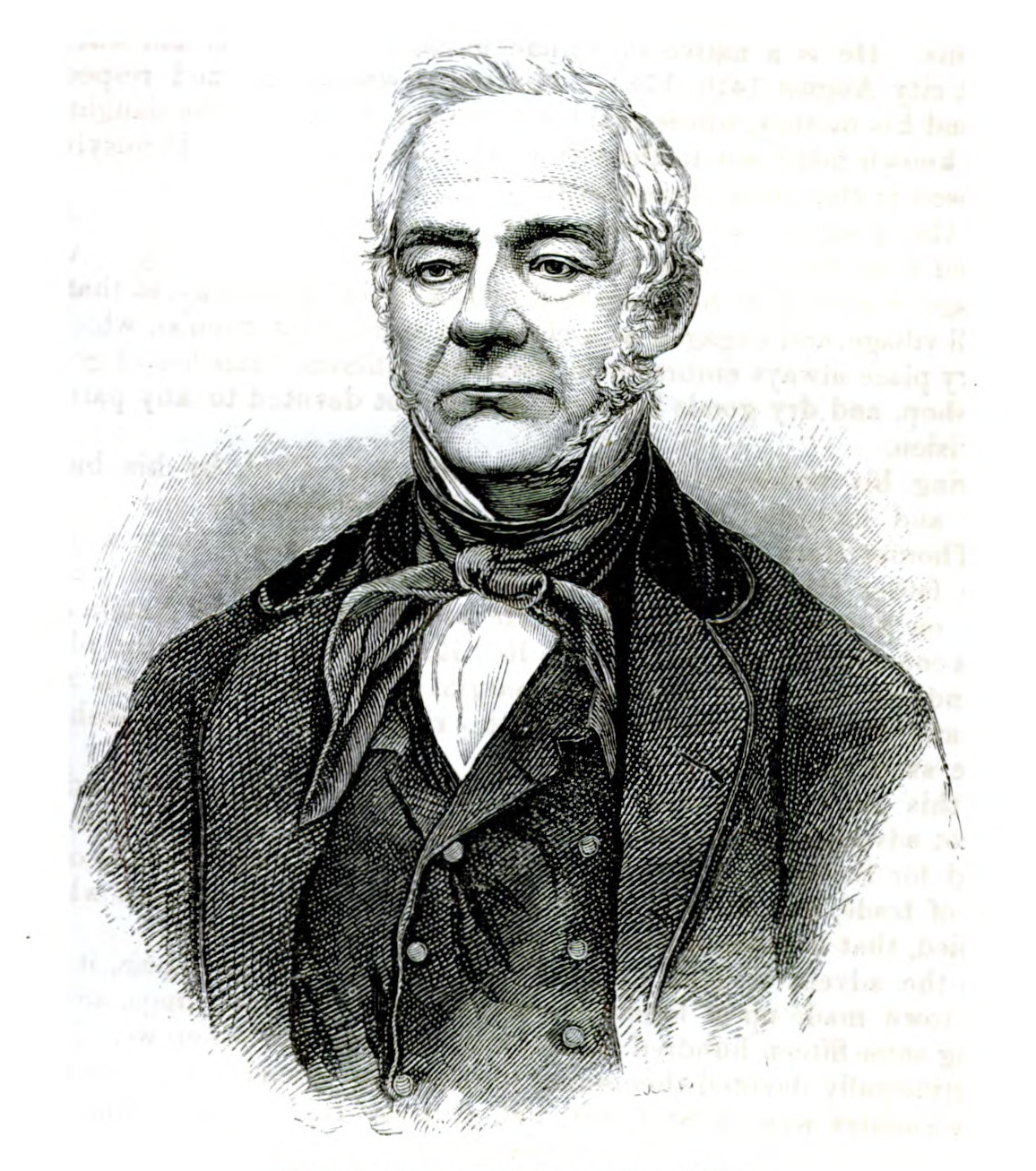
Likeness of "Henry Von Phul, Esq.", engraved from a photograph, c. 1860

Von Phul commenced business in St. Louis in a small store on Main Street, keeping goods, groceries and other merchandise as is usually kept in country stores. In 1817, he and Auguste Chouteau raised funds to buy a fire engine and build a firehouse for the city.

In 1831, von Phul formed a partnership with Theodore McGill, under the style of Von Phul & McGill (later Von Phul, Waters, and Company, and finally H. von Phul, Sons, and Company), and moved to the corner of Olive Street and the levee, where he was largely engaged in the grocery business and steamboat agency, owning an interest in some of the largest steamboats of that day. He was afterward senior partner of the Von Phul, Waters & Co. firm, a respected business house in St. Louis. He was continually in business as a St. Louis merchant for over sixty years. He filled several important positions connected with the municipal government of St. Louis and was connected with many of her public and private institutions, both civil and charitable.

== Later life and death ==
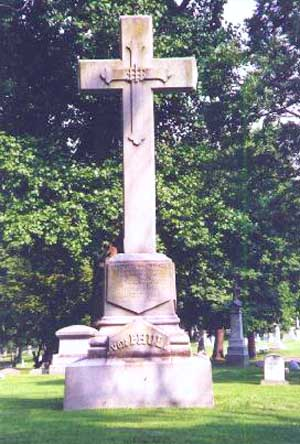
Shared tomb of Henry and Rosalie von Phul, Calvary Cemetery and Mausoleum, St. Louis

In 1872, the New Orleans branch of his company, under the management of his sons, went bankrupt. The elderly von Phul, then eighty-eight, insisted upon paying his sons' creditors, and although doing so exhausted his personal fortune, "even to his wife's dower", this final act of integrity earned him the respect and admiration of his peers.

Two years later, at 3 p.m. on September 8, 1874, Henry von Phul died at his residence, 1516 Olive Street, St. Louis. He had been prostrated for some time, and his death had been expected for several days. He left forty-three grandchildren and four great-grandchildren. The Union Merchants' Exchange draped their hall of exchange in mourning for thirty days, and some of Von Phul's friends presented a full-length portrait of the "old and honored merchant" to be hung there.

== Personal life ==
In 1816, von Phul was married to Rosalie Genevieve Saugrain (1797–1887), daughter of Dr. Antoine Saugrain, of which marriage were born fifteen children, ten of whom survived:

- Maria Taylor, wife of Thomas M. Taylor, of St. Louis;
- Eliza Cook, wife of Judge William M. Cook;
- Julia Bird, wife of A. T. Bird, planter in Louisiana;
- Sophie von Phul;
- Henry von Phul, Jun., a planter of Louisiana;
- Fred von Phul, commission merchant of St. Louis;
- Frank von Phul, merchant of New Orleans;
- William von Phul, planter in Louisiana;
- Benjamin von Phul, cotton broker of St. Louis;
- Philip Phil Phul, of St. Louis.

On June 10, 1866, he celebrated his golden wedding, which was attended by many of the old citizens of St. Louis who still remained alive. In 1819 he was elected a vestryman of the new Christ Episcopal Church in St. Louis, but later in life he converted to Roman Catholicism.

== See also ==
- History of St. Louis (1804–1865)
- Thomas Allen
- John Mullanphy
- Robert Campbell

== Bibliography ==
- Conard, Howard Louis (1901). "Von Phul, Henry". Encyclopedia of the History of Missouri: A Compendium of History and Biography for Ready Reference. Vol. 6. New York, Louisville, St. Louis: The Southern History Company, Haldeman, Conard & Co., Proprietors. p. 304.
- Edwards, Richard; Hopewell, M. (1860). Edwards's Great West and Her Commercial Metropolis. St. Louis: Edwards's monthly. pp. 90–93.
- Heming, Carol (1999). "Henry von Phul (1784–1874)". In Christensen, Lawrence O.; Foley, William E.; Kremer, Gary R.; Winn, Kenneth H. (eds.). Dictionary of Missouri Biography (online ed.). Columbia, MO: University of Missouri Press.
- Stevens, Walter B. (1911). St. Louis: The Fourth City, 1764–1911. Vol. 2. St. Louis and Chicago: The S. J. Clarke Publishing Co. pp. 418, 465, 480, 544, 586, 689–90.
- "Death of the Oldest Merchant of St. Louis". The Cincinnati Enquirer. September 10, 1874. p. 4.
