= Gwendolyn Grant (activist) =

Kansas City activist

Gwendolyn Grant is an American activist. She is president and CEO of the Urban League of Greater Kansas City. She became their first female CEO in 1995.

Grant has received numerous honors including the National Urban League's Whitney M. Young Leadership Award for Advancing Racial Equity and the Southern Christian Leadership Conference Community Service Award.

== Personal life ==
Grant grew up in Kansas City and has spent her entire life there except for one year in Jackson, Mississippi. She graduated from Park University in 1994. She also earned an executive MBA from Rockhurst University.

== Law enforcement ==
Local chapters of the American Civil Liberties Union, the Southern Christian Leadership Conference and the Urban League organized a march on 4 September 2020 from the Kansas City, Missouri, city hall to the Liberty Memorial to commemorate the 57th anniversary of the 1963 March on Washington. The marchers were demanding an end to what they said was "a corrupt, cover-up culture at the police department that perpetuates systemic racism", led by Police Chief Rick Smith, according to Gwendolyn Grant. The marchers were demanding an end to police brutality against Black individuals starting with firing Smith.

Over six months later, as the trial of former Minneapolis police officer Chauvin began for the murder of George Floyd, people in Kansas City were interviewed for their thoughts on this. Grant noted that "the evidence is compelling" in the video of Chauvin, who is white, kneeling on George Floyd's neck for over nine minutes. Surely "there's no other outcome other than a murder conviction here," Grant said. "But history has taught us something different."

On May 29, 2024, "Activist Gwen Grant Demands 'Unity' Amid Jackson County Prosecutor Vote". She expressed concern that an intense campaign between three Democrats, Stephanie Burton, John Gromowsky, and Melesa Johnson, for the August primary could increase the chances of a Republican victory in the November general election. Grant is concerned that any likely Republican as Jackson County Prosecutor would pursue racist prosecutions against African Americans.

=== Lawsuits ===
On June 14, 2021 KSHB-TV reported that Grant had filed a motion to intervene in a lawsuit filed by the Kansas City, Missouri, Board of Police Commissioners (BOPC) against the city. On May 28, 2021, the BOPC had sued the city of Kansas City, Missouri, Mayor Quinton Lucas, the rest of the city council, City Manager Brian Platt and Director of Finance Tammy Queen for violating the Missouri state law says that at least one-fifth of the city's general revenue must go to its police department. Grant's motion and this BOPD lawsuit has a history dating back to February 26, 1861, after Abraham Lincoln had been elected president of the US and after the deep South (South Carolina, Mississippi, Florida, Alabama, Georgia, Louisiana, and Texas) had seceded but six days before Lincoln was inaugurated: On that date Missouri state Senator Joseph O’Neil introduced a bill to give the state control over the police of the city of St. Louis. The Missouri state government did not want the police force of the largest city to be controlled by a population with the largest concentration of African Americans in the state. That bill was passed and signed into law on March 27, 1861, sixteen days before the first shots were fired at Ft. Sumpter. Then-Gov. Claiborne Fox Jackson appointed four secessionists to the St. Louis police board hoping to take control of the weapons in the St. Louis Arsenal, the largest arsenal in a slave state, and join the Confederacy. The Union army defeated that attempt in what is called the Camp Jackson affair, and Governor Jackson was forced out of office by the Unionist majority. Missouri stayed with the Union during the American Civil War, but that law remained on the books. Meanwhile, the Black population of Kansas City grew from 190 in 1860 to 8,100 in 1880, when the state decided to extend state control of the police to include Kansas City as well as St. Louis. From that date, people in Kansas City, Missouri, have complained of corruption in their police department, run by the Missouri Governor as a means of limiting the power of Kansas City politics, which has usually been different from the politics of most of the rest of the state, especially regarding African Americans. In 2021, Ms. Grant filed a motion to intervene in the lawsuit between the BOPD and the city, claiming that the actions of the BOPD constituted taxation without representation in violation of the 1980 Hancock Amendment, which among other things prohibits "unfunded mandates", whereby the state requires a local jurisdiction to do something without providing state funds.

Three months later on September 15, it was reported that Grant filed a separate lawsuit against the city, the mayor, the city council, the city manager, the director of finance and the Board of Police Commissioners, on roughly the same grounds as the motion, that their actions regarding funding the Kansas City, Missouri, Police Department was "taxation without representation" in violation of Missouri's Hancock Amendment.

Another two months later, Grant was asking city leaders, "If Black lives really matter, why then are you not stepping up in ways to dismantle the system that consistently oppresses Black people?" "Law enforcement, economics, housing, the urban core, the infrastructure. Why are you not using your power and your resources to truly change the environment in which we live?" "Grant convenes the Urban League's Police Accountability Task Force - a coalition of civil rights, community-based, faith-based and civic organizations" working to improve the Kansas City, Missouri, Police Department. They've considered "a statewide ballot initiative that would ask voters to approve giving control of the department back to the city," but Grant "said the campaign would cost roughly $3.5 million they don't have ... ."

== Urban Summit ==
The Urban League of Greater Kansas City held its 16th Urban Summit on November 4, 2023. It included discussions of their 2023 report on the "State of Black Kansas City". The report was called “From Redlining to Chalk Lines”. Grant said that, "When people are locked into enclaves of poverty, crime is a result ... we have to stop doing piecemeal work and starting doing real work by making significant financial investments in our distressed communities". As part of this, Grant presented an "equality index chart," that measures how African Americans are doing in the areas of economics, education, social justice, health, and civic engagement, compared to white Americans. Conclusion: Black Kansas Citians scored 75%, which means they are missing 25% compared to white Kansas Citians.

The 14th annual Urban Summit of Kansas City in 2021 was designed to "focus on the racial wealth gap and produce a strategy defining its advocacy agenda for 2022." Grant said, "We need to invest in really giving people more than just equal access".

== Health ==
"Project Wellness" is a major initiative of the Urban League of Greater Kansas City. It is designed to improve access to quality health care for underserved urban communities. This program accounts for almost 60% of their $2.1 million expenses in 2022. Early in the COVID-19 pandemic, Grant insisted that the Urban League of Greater Kansas City was "Equal to the Challenge": Their "staff began working remotely on Monday, March 16", 2020, helping provide the community with information and resources, focusing especially on employment assistance, academic tutoring / online coaching.

== Opinions sought by the media ==
Grant was a regular on the weekly local news roundtable Ruckus on KCPT at least from 2013 until the show was paused in 2020.

== Other ==
In 2021 Grant's Urban League partnered with the Kansas City Area Transportation Authority to decorate a bus with messages commemorating the 100-year history of the National Urban League (founded in 1910).

In 2022, KCUR, the local NPR station, reported that, "The median household income of Black residents in Kansas City is 62% that of white residents, according to data compiled by the Urban League of Greater Kansas City, and Black residents are unemployed at rates between 1.5 to 2 times higher than white residents." The city council of Kansas City, Missouri, was considering an ordinance to create a Mayor's Commission on Reparations. Grant claimed that reparations would reduce crime and violence by bridging the wealth gap and improving education.
