= Antoine Saugrain =

French-American physician (1763–1820)

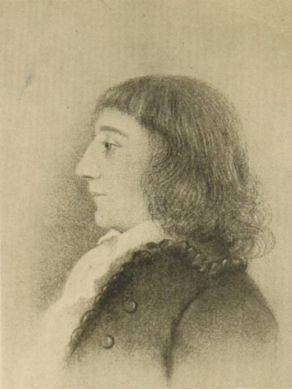
Antoine Saugrain

Antoine François Pierre Saugrain (Paris, France, February 17, 1763 – St. Louis, Missouri, March 5, 1820) was a French-born American medical doctor and chemist.

Born in Versailles, Saugrain was educated in Paris as a medical doctor and chemist by Antoine Fourcroy and Mathurin Jacques Brisson; Saugrain was brother-in-law to Joseph-Ignace Guillotin, who had married Louise Saugrain, Antoine's sister. In 1783, he traveled to North America to serve as a mineralogist for Gilbert Antoine de St. Maxent at New Orleans, where he was admitted to the practice of surgery. He also collaborated with his brother-in-law on the development of vaccines.

In 1787, Saugrain traveled to the United States bearing a letter of introduction from Benjamin Franklin. He became part of a scientific expedition to explore the Ohio River led by the botanist Picque in 1788. However, Saugrain was injured during a Native American raid and returned to France. Saugrain was soon forced to flee France because of his royalist beliefs at the beginning of the French Revolution in 1789 (Saugrain's family line had held the position of royal librarian for over 250 years by the time of the Revolution).

He returned to the United States and helped found a French émigré community at Gallipolis, Ohio. It was there that he married Genevieve Rosalie Michau on 20/03/1793. In 1799 the Saugrains moved to St. Louis, a city which had been developed by French immigrants as part of Louisiana (New France). Saugrain was the city's only physician until the United States took possession of St. Louis following the 1803 Louisiana Purchase by the United States.

Saugrain prepared specimens for Meriwether Lewis to send to President Thomas Jefferson in early 1804. He also provided the Lewis and Clark Expedition with medical supplies.

Saugrain was the first physician west of the Mississippi River to use the Jenner cowpox vaccine to prevent smallpox, beginning in 1809. From a public health perspective, his willingness to vaccinate anyone, regardless of ability to pay is especially noteworthy. The Missouri State Historical Society has a copy of an advertisement of Dr. Saugrain’s offering vaccine to all persons of indigent circumstances as well as to doctors who lived outside his practice area.

Outside medicine Saugrain also had interests in mineralogy, physics and chemistry.

Saugrain experimented with early versions of phosphorus matches and manufactured thermometers and barometers at Gallipolis.

His daughter Rosalie Saugrain (1797–1787) was married to the St. Louis pioneer businessmen Henry Von Phul (1784–1874), brother of the American artist Anna Maria von Phul. He was the grandfather of Frank (Francis) von Phul (1835–1922).

In 1944 a Liberty ship SS Antoine Saugrain was named in his honor.

== Sources ==
- United States National Park Service
- Priddy, Bob. Across Our Wide Missouri, Independence Press, 1982.
- Saugrain Family Papers Missouri History Museum Archives
