= SS Antoine Saugrain =

Ship of the United States

History

United States
- Name: Antoine Saugrain
- Namesake: Dr. Antoine Saugrain
- Operator: Agwilines Inc of New York
- Builder: Permanente Metals Corporation Yard No. 2, Richmond, California
- Way number: 12
- Laid down: 26 July 1943
- Launched: 15 August 1943
- Acquired: 28 August 1943
- Fate: Sunk, 6 December 1944

General characteristics
- Class & type: Liberty ship
- Displacement: 14,245 long tons (14,474 t)
- Length: 441 ft 6 in (134.57 m)
- Beam: 56 ft 11 in (17.35 m)
- Draft: 27 ft 9 in (8.46 m)
- Propulsion: Two oil-fired boilers; Triple-expansion steam engine; Single screw; 2,500 hp (1,864 kW)
- Speed: 11 knots (20 km/h; 13 mph)
- Range: 23,000 mi (37,000 km)
- Capacity: 10,856 t (10,685 long tons) deadweight (DWT)
- Complement: 41 men
- Armament: 1 × Stern-mounted 4 in (100 mm) deck gun for use against surfaced submarines; Variety of anti-aircraft guns

SS Antoine Saugrain was a Liberty ship of the United States that served in World War II. The ship was built at the Permanente Metals Corporation Yard No. 2 in Richmond, California under Maritime Commission Contract 1728. Laid down on 26 July 1943, the ship was launched on 15 August, and delivered on 28 August to Agwilines Inc. She was named after Antoine Saugrain, a French physician and chemist who immigrated to America at the end of the 18th century and led various pioneering works, including on vaccination against smallpox.

During the naval Battle of Leyte she was torpedoed off Leyte on 5 December 1944, and sank the next day.

== Sinking ==
Antoine Saugrain fought off 12 kamikaze torpedo planes on 5 December 1944. Twelve gunners were wounded and merchant seamen took over the machine guns to fight off the attack. Two days later she was sunk by a torpedo plane while in tow in the Surigao Strait near Leyte Gulf. Some of the 450 survivors had to swim a long time before being rescued.

The Coast Guard frigate's role of escorting convoys from the staging areas to the invasion sites likewise was crucial. In late November, the Coronado and San Pedro left Humboldt Bay, New Guinea, to steam the 1,250 miles to escort a convoy of ships bringing supplies and men to Leyte. The voyage proceeded without incident until 5 December when enemy planes attacked the convoy. One Japanese torpedo plane attacked the SS Antoine Saugrain from the port beam. The torpedo struck the freighter at the stern, exploded, and carried away its rudder. Fifteen minutes later another torpedo bomber approached the Saugrain and despite heavy gunfire, put a torpedo in the ship at the number two hold. This torpedo fatally wounded the vessel. The Saugrain had on board nearly 450 crew and Army troops. The Coronado and San Pedro steamed to the assistance of the freighter and saved all hands.

== History ==
The entire campaign for Leyte was that made on a convoy that was north-east of Mindanao and just one day out of Leyte on December 5. The Armed Guard voyage reports of 15 merchant ships tell the story of the action which resulted in the loss of one merchant ship, Antoine Saugrain, and damage to two other ships, Marcus Daly and John Evans. Japanese plane losses probably amounted to ten planes destroyed. The action opened with a bombing attack at about 0840, which did no damage. At 1220, Antoine Saugrain claimed hits on a torpedo plane that was strafing the convoy. A little later a torpedo hit the ship. At 1231 she claimed hits on another torpedo plane and almost immediately was hit by a second torpedo in her No. 2 hold. At 1247 the order was given to abandon ship. She finally went down while being towed to Leyte on December 6.

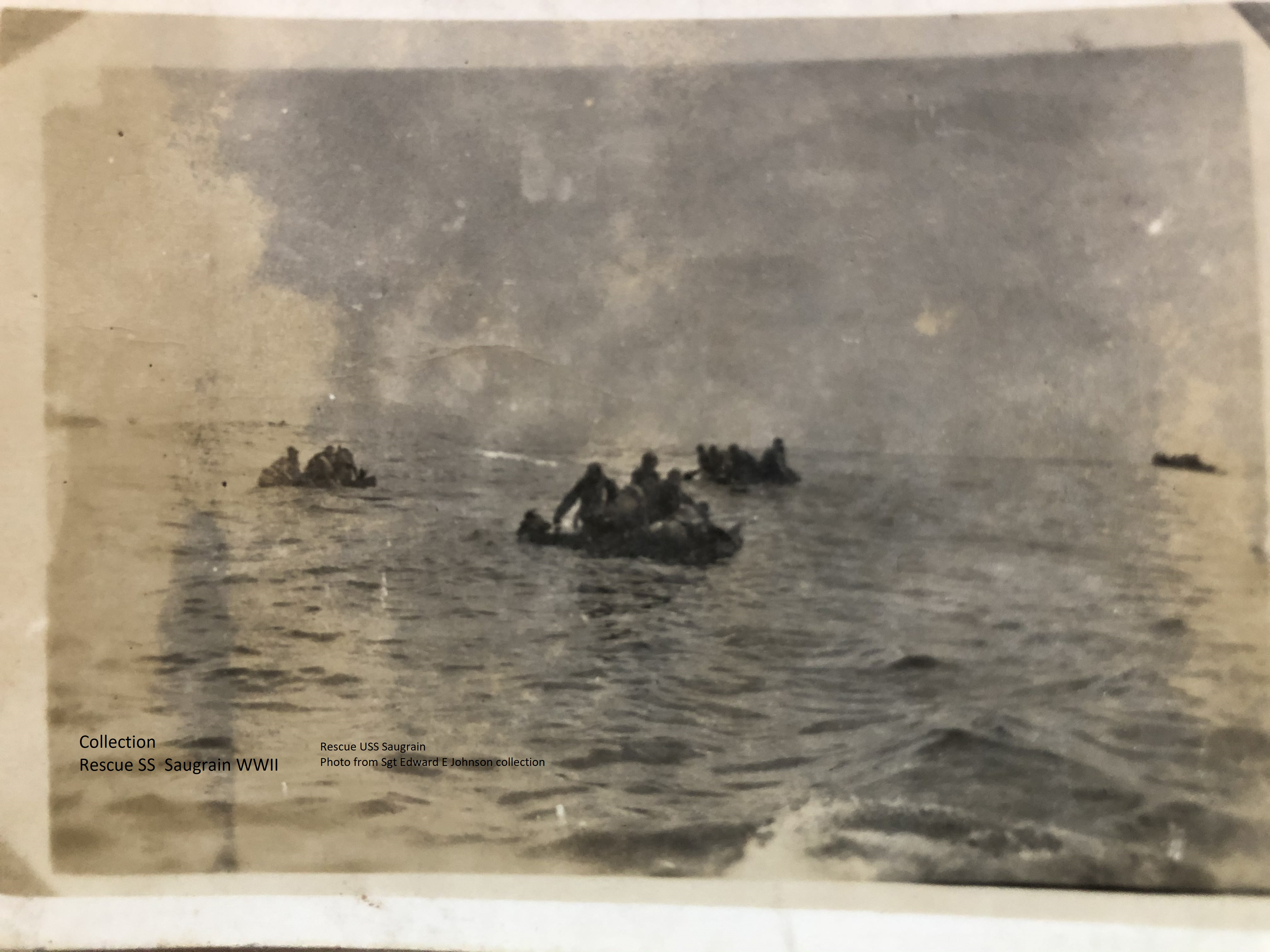
USSSaugrainrescueboats1944

John Evans was more fortunate. She accounted for two planes during the afternoon of December 5, but the second plane crashed into her. A bomb exploded as the plane crashed. The Evans was able to make Leyte on December 6. Two Armed Guards and two members of her crew were wounded.

The Marcus Daly, already a veteran of the worst attacks in the Leyte campaign in October, brought down two planes before a third hit her at about 1530 and made a hole “large enough to drive a train through”. The resulting fire was not brought under control until midnight. A torpedo missed the ship. Some 200 Army personnel were killed, missing, or wounded. One Armed Guard was killed and seven were wounded. Two members of the merchant crew were also killed. This proud ship made Leyte, and on December 10 assisted in shooting down a plane that managed to crash into her. The Armed Guard officer and seven other Armed Guards were wounded in this attack, but the Daly remained afloat.

Other merchant ships in the convoy gave a good account of themselves both on December 5 and in later attacks at Leyte. Cape Gaspe destroyed one plane on December 5 and received credit for an assist on December 10. Army personnel set up and manned additional machine guns. She reported 63 alerts between December 6 and 18. Lew Wallace was credited with the destruction of one plane and assistance in destroying two others on December 5. A bomb missed by only 40 yards. On December 10 she downed another plane and assisted in shooting down yet another. These planes were reported to have crashed into William C. Ladd and Marcus Daly. Conrad Kohrs was credited with one assist on December 5. H. H. Raymond claimed a plane destroyed on December 5 and was credited with a plane on December 20. The latter plane dropped a bomb and then apparently tried to crash into the ship. It fell into the water 200 yards from the Raymond. The James H. Breasted was credited with one plane downed, one assist, and one plane probably destroyed on December 5. At 1450 a bomb barely missed her 3”/50 gun tub. The plane that torpedoed Saugrain on December 5 also strafed John Hart. The Hart was credited with the destruction of one plane on December 6. Peter Lassen was credited with the destruction of one plane on December 20. William S. Colley was credited with the destruction of the plane that crashed into a ship on December 5. Richard Yates received no credit for planes destroyed on December 5 but claimed hits on one plane. James H. Lane was credited with an assist on December 5 and destroyed another plane on December 25. Her Armed Guard officer reported that a torpedo passed the stern of the ship and missed by only 50 feet. The Lane was in the Leyte-Samar area from December 6 to April 8. Earlier, she had participated in the Morotai campaign and had assisted in destroying an enemy plane on October 31, 1944. Morton M. McCarver was in the December 5 attack but did not destroy any Japanese planes.

The only other merchant ship to be sunk in the Leyte operation was William S. Ladd. Before she went down in Leyte Gulf she established the proud record of four planes destroyed. She accounted for one plane on the afternoon of December 5 and knocked down three on December 10. One of these planes crashed into her and set 500 drums of gasoline afire. A number of explosions in No. 4 and No. 5 holds followed at 1830 and the ship began to settle by the stern. At 1750 the after guns had been secured and the men manning them were ordered to abandon ship. At 1840 guns No. 1 to 5 were ordered secured and the Armed Guards were ordered to abandon ship. Not until 1930 did the last Navy personnel and ship's officers abandon the doomed vessel. Eight Armed Guards were wounded when the plane crashed into Ladd.

"On 5 December 1944, the USS Glendale was escorting a convoy from Hollandia, New Guinea, to Leyte when attacking Japanese aircraft sank SS Antoine Saugrain, a cargo ship laden with valuable radar material, and severely damaged SS Marcus Daly. She brought the rest of the convoy safely into Leyte the next day.

Date occurred	Name of ship	Type	Type of attack	Result	Country	Killed/wounded
12/05/44	Antoine Saugrain	Liberty	Aerial torpedo	Damaged	Philippines	None
12/05/44	John Evans	Liberty	Kamikaze	Damaged	Philippines	None
12/05/44	Marcus Daly (GSA)	Liberty	Kamikaze	Damaged	Philippines	None
12/06/44	Marcus Daly (GSA)	Liberty	Kamikaze	Damaged	Philippines	None [AG wounded]
12/06/44	Antoine Saugrain	Liberty	Aerial Torpedo	Sunk	Philippines	None
12/10/44	Marcus Daly (GSA)	Liberty	Kamikaze	Damaged	Philippines	Crew 2; AG 1; Army over 200
12/10/44	William S. Ladd	Liberty	Kamikaze	Sunk	Philippines	None

== Bibliography ==
- Heroes in Dungarees: The Story of the American Merchant Marine in ... - Google Books Result by John Bunker - 2006 - History - 369 pages The ship was hit and sunk several days later by an aerial torpedo...
- Source official US Coast Guard website - http://www.uscg.mil/History/articles/Leyte.asp
- Source USS Glendale (PF-36)
- Benefits to Merchant Seamen: Hearings Before the Committee on the Merchant ... - Page 10 by United States Congress. House Committee on Merchant Marine and Fisheries, United States, Congress, House - Merchant mariners - 1945 - 482 pages. In numerous instances the Japs paid dearly for their attacks on merchant vessels Typical of this was the case of the Antoine Saugrain. ...
- U.S. Army Ships and Watercraft of World War II - Page 61 by David Hubert Grover - History - 1987 - 280 pages A 12-44 Fire Scheldt Estuary D Alcoa Banner, A 1-45 Air attack Antwerp D Andrea F. Luckenbach, A 3-43 Submarine N. Atlantic L Antoine Saugrain
- Liberty ships: The Ugly Ducklings of World War II - Page 150 by John Gorley Bunker - World War, 1939-1945 - 1972 - 287 pages The Antoine Saugrain beat off several of 35 bombers during one raid on Leyte. Almost all of her Navy gunners were wounded, and merchant seamen manned the ..
- Dictionary of American Naval Fighting Ships - Page 107 by United States Naval History Division, Naval Historical Center (U.S.) - Warships - 1959 On 5 December 1944, Glendale was escorting a convoy from Hollandia to Leyte when attacking Japanese planes sank SS Antoine Saugrain, a cargo ship laden with...
- Liberty by Peter Elphick 2006 history - 512 pages The Antoine Saugrain (built in Richmond, August 1943) was in convoy making for the strait between Mindanao and...
- United States Congressional Serial Set by United States Government Printing Office - United States - 1951 On the 5th day of December 1944, the steamship Antoine Saugrain was hit by Japanese bombers at longitude 129°30', latitude 9°30'. ..
- Oral history-one oral history anecdote was from T-Sgt Edward Johnson. He jumped 40 feet with a wounded soldier in his arms as the ship was sinking. No one died in the attack, many were wounded.
- US Navy official website - http://www.history.navy.mil/faqs/faq104-10.htm
