= Anna Maria von Phul =

American artist (1786–1823)

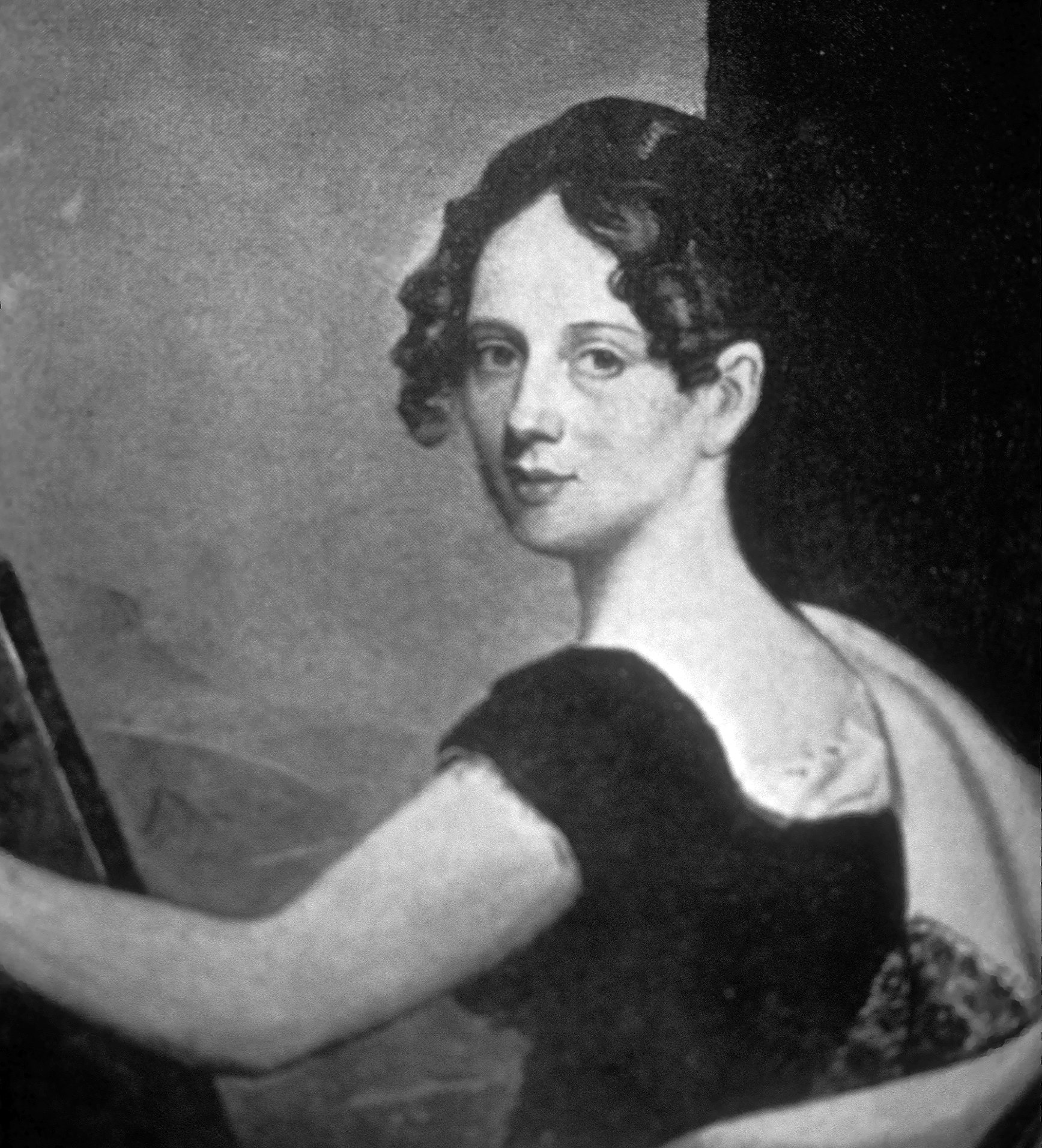
- Anna Maria von Phul, 1817
- Born: 1786; Philadelphia, Pennsylvania, U.S.
- Died: 1823 (aged 36–37); Edwardsville, Illinois, U.S.

Anna Maria von Phul (1786–1823) was an American artist who used watercolor to illustrate local Creole culture, including architecture, clothing, hairstyles, and other aspects of daily life. Much of her body of work was created in the St. Louis region.

== Life ==
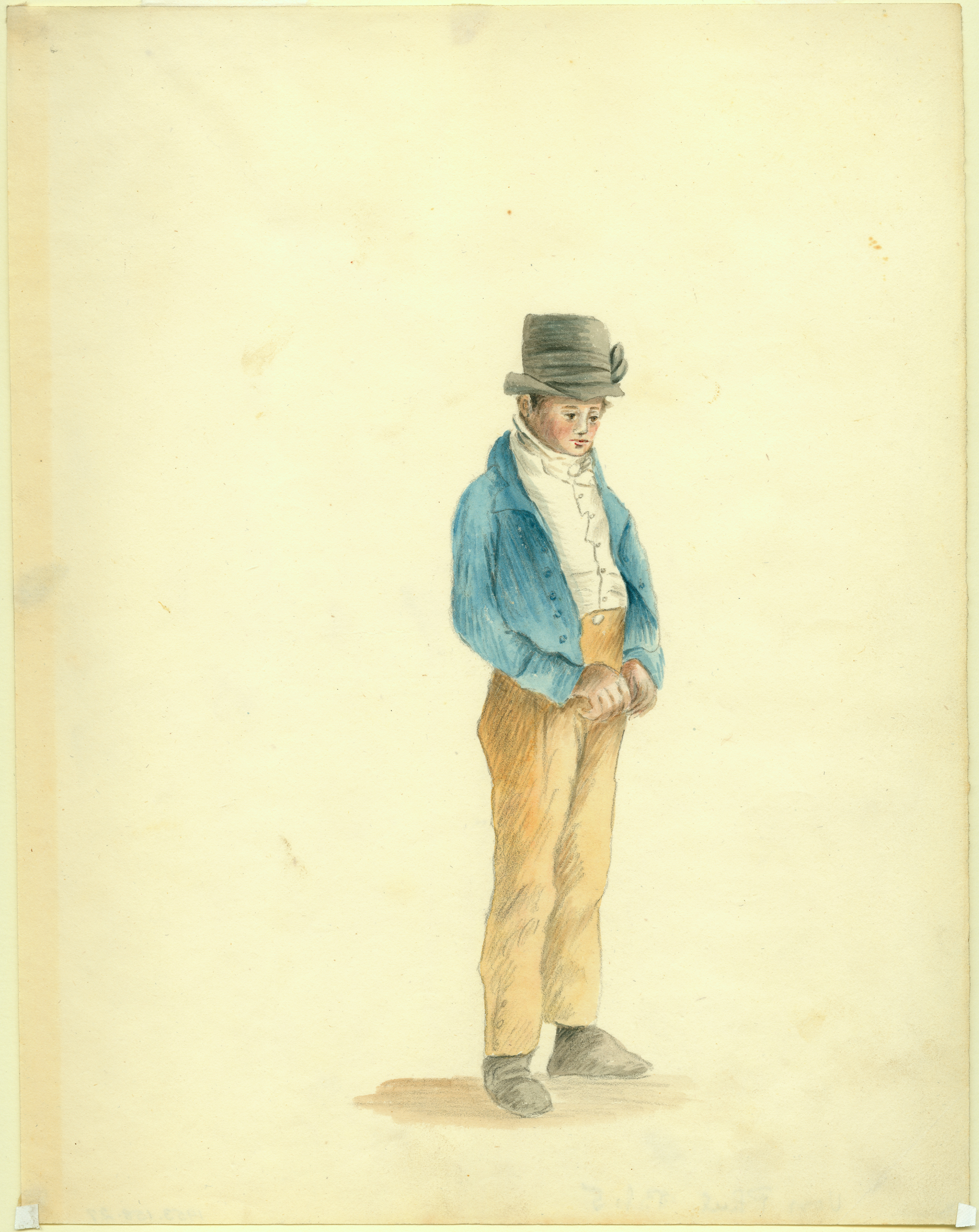
Watercolor painting of a boy in a beaver hat in St. Louis by Anna Maria von Phul, 1818

Anna Maria von Phul was born in 1786 in Philadelphia. She soon moved to Kentucky with her widowed mother and siblings. While in Kentucky, von Phul studied French, drawing, and watercolor at a young-ladies academy in Lexington operated by George and Mary Beck, painting some of the town's architecture. Art was typically considered a hobby for many of the more elite young women in the early 1800s, but von Phul showed a particular talent and was encouraged by her family and instructors to continue her artistic studies. Von Phul chose instead to devote her time to her family, creating works of art only in her free time. She never pursued art professionally. Most of her drawings and watercolors were created as gifts for her friends and family.

Around 1817–8, von Phul traveled to St. Louis to visit her brother, Henry, who was a businessman in St. Louis, and her sister, who was living in the neighboring town of Edwardsville, Illinois. Between 1817 and 1821, von Phul created the majority of her remaining artwork. None of von Phul's sketches and watercolors produced after 1821 survive. She died on July 28, 1823, while visiting her sister in Edwardsville. An obituary was published in the Edwardsville Spectator.

== Artwork ==
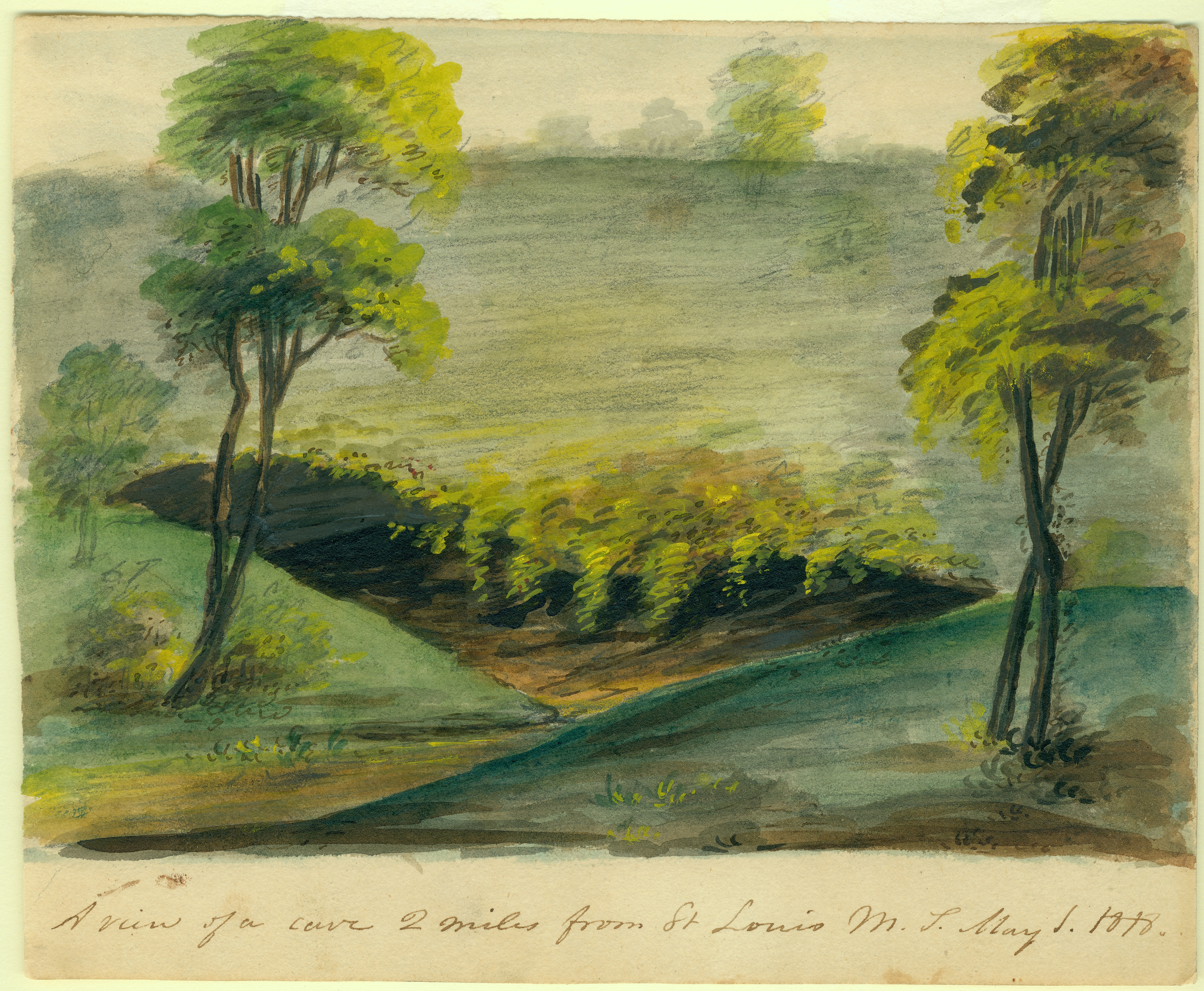
Watercolor painting by Anna Maria von Phul, "A View of a Cave, 2 Miles from St. Louis, Missouri Territory", 1818

Anna Maria von Phul's earlier sketches and watercolors are mostly limited to landscapes and silhouettes. Her later works depict various aspects of the local Creole life in the St. Louis area, which later earned her the title, "the Eyes of the Missouri Territory". Her watercolors are small and painted delicately, but provide significant insights into Creole life in St. Louis during the early 1800s. These paintings are especially important because they illustrate the colors of the Creole culture. Some of her works depict the people of the Creole culture as working class.

The subjects of her artwork include landscapes, buildings, furniture, clothing, jewelry, hairstyles, horse-drawn carriages, and people engaged in typical everyday activities. She filled multiple sketchbooks with her work, which were later rediscovered by her descendants in 1953 and donated to the Missouri Historical Society. A short biography by Cathy Johnson was published in 2001.
