= Fee Fee Creek =

Watercourse in suburban St. Louis, Missouri

Coordinates: 38.7406072°N 90.4709522°W

Fee Fee Creek is a stream in St. Louis County in the U.S. state of Missouri.

Fee Fee Greenway, a wildlife corridor created by Great Rivers Greenways, runs along the creek from Maryland Heights Community Center to Creve Couer Lake Memorial Park.

Fee Fee Creek derives its name from Nicholas Beaugenou Jr., nicknamed "Fifi," a pioneer citizen who established a farm on the creek bank in 1795.

== See also ==
- List of rivers of Missouri
