= History of St. Louis (1804–1865) =

The history of St. Louis, Missouri from 1804 to 1865 included the creation of St. Louis as the territorial capital of the Louisiana Territory, a brief period of growth until the Panic of 1819 and subsequent depression, rapid diversification of industry after the introduction of the steamboat and the return of prosperity, and rising tensions about the issues of immigration and slavery. St. Louis also played a role in the American Civil War.

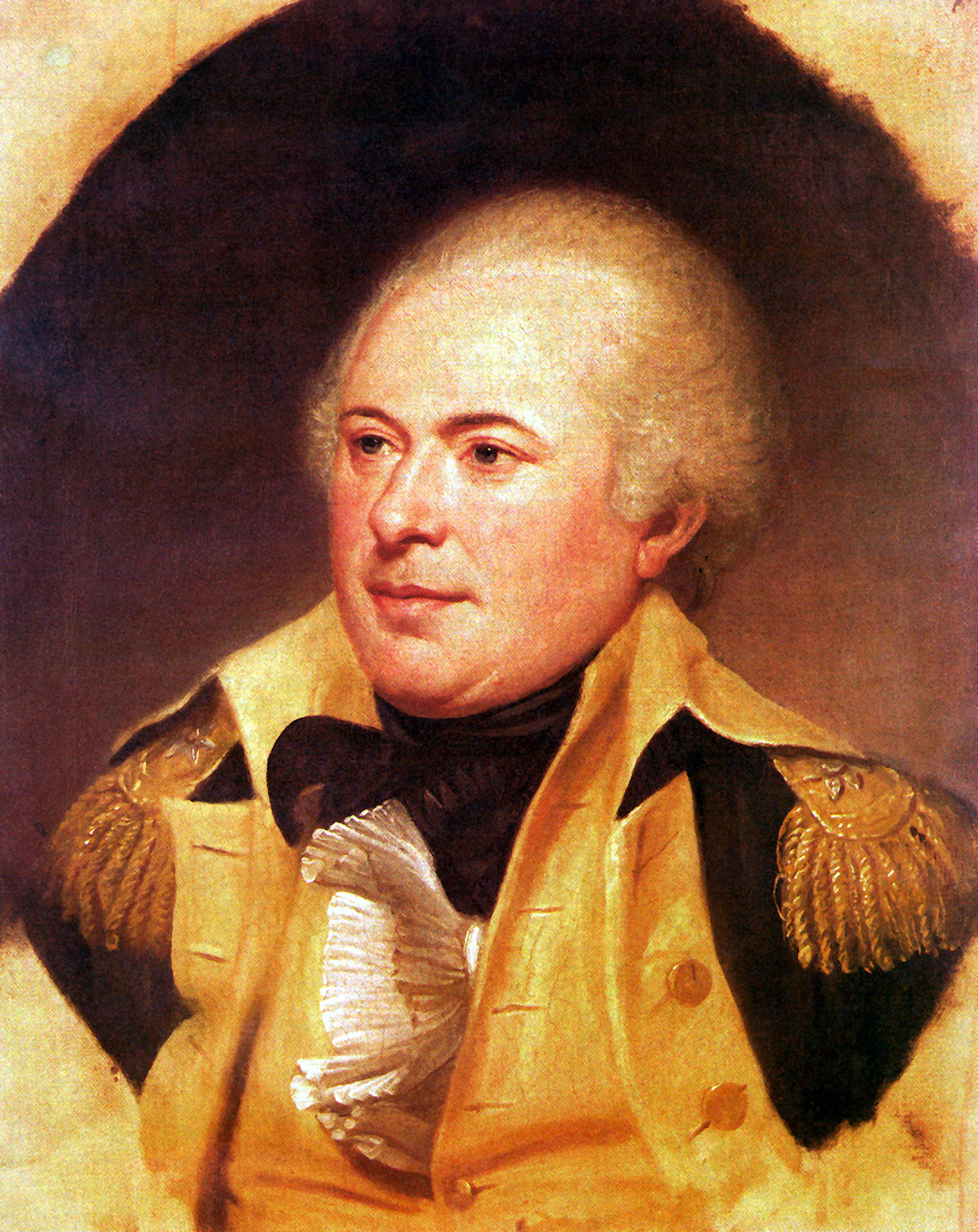
James Wilkinson, first governor of the Louisiana Territory, including St. Louis

== Changes in government and politics ==
After the last Spanish lieutenant governor surrendered upper Louisiana and St. Louis to Amos Stoddard, representative of France and the United States, Stoddard was given civil command of the territory (March-October 1804) until the U.S. Congress acted further. Stoddard quickly established a citizens' committee (led by leading Creole families) to write local regulations. However, Congress passed an organization law that separated the Louisiana Purchase at the 33rd parallel, with the upper part including St. Louis to be called the District of Louisiana and governed by officials from the Indiana Territory. The district was divided into sub-districts that included St. Louis, St. Charles, and Ste. Genevieve, among others. The act also banned the foreign slave trade and nullified any land grants greater than 640 acres made after October 1, 1800. Most wealthy Creoles found the new organization law to be particularly repulsive, if not for its threat toward slavery then due to its reduction of the significance of St. Louis.

The Creole families and Americans who held large Spanish land grants thus petitioned Congress in 1804 to review the system. The petition received support from the territorial governor, William Henry Harrison, and in July 1805, Congress reorganized the District of Louisiana as the Louisiana Territory, with its territorial capital at St. Louis. The new reorganization also created a land claims board that would review large land grant claims to determine their legitimacy. Jefferson quickly appointed James Wilkinson as the new territorial governor, with John Coburn, Rufus Easton, and John Baptiste Charles Lucas as territorial judges. Both Easton and Lucas remained fixtures of St. Louis government well into the 19th century.

By 1806, Wilkinson had become widely unpopular in St. Louis due to his interference with the land claims review board and refusal to convene a territorial legislature. Wilkinson also had befriended Aaron Burr, which provoked rumors that the two were planning a western rebellion. Wilkinson thus was removed from office in May 1806 and replaced in early 1807 by Meriwether Lewis, explorer and co-namesake of the Lewis and Clark Expedition, who took office in March 1808. Lewis's tenure was short, however, as he died on a trip to Washington, D.C. in late 1809.

The population of the city expanded slowly after the Louisiana Purchase, but with expansion came increased desire to incorporate St. Louis as a town, allowing it to create local ordinances without the approval of the territorial legislature. After a failed effort in 1808, the local district court approved a petition from the town to incorporate, and on November 27, 1809, the first Board of Trustees were elected to represent the citizens of the town.

The Board of Trustees was composed primarily of members of the Creole elite and newly arrived Americans: Auguste Chouteau, William C. Carr, Jean Cabanne, Edward Hempstead, and William Christy, with Chouteau chosen as the chairman. The Board primarily concerned itself with slave control, except for one ordinance banning horse racing on city streets. Other ordinances created volunteer fire department companies, required the removal of dead animals from the town, and created a streets overseer who was able to order males to work on streets adjacent to their property. The town also enacted a small property tax and obtained some revenue from issuing business licenses.

The Board of Trustees established a constabulary to enforce its ordinances, which consisted of four men who served without pay, chosen on a rotating basis from among the adult men of the town. The district and town jail was located in the former masonry tower, known as Fort San Carlos, built by Leyba for the Battle of St. Louis in 1780. Crime remained relatively rare until the 1810s; the city's first murder occurred in 1817.

In 1812, the Louisiana Territory was renamed the Missouri Territory, and from 1812 to 1821, St. Louis remained the capital of the territory. In addition to renaming the territory, all subdistricts (such as St. Louis, St. Charles, Ste. Genevieve, etc.) were renamed as counties. In the new territorial legislature, St. Louis County (which at that time included the town of St. Louis) was entitled to four representatives, the most of any county.

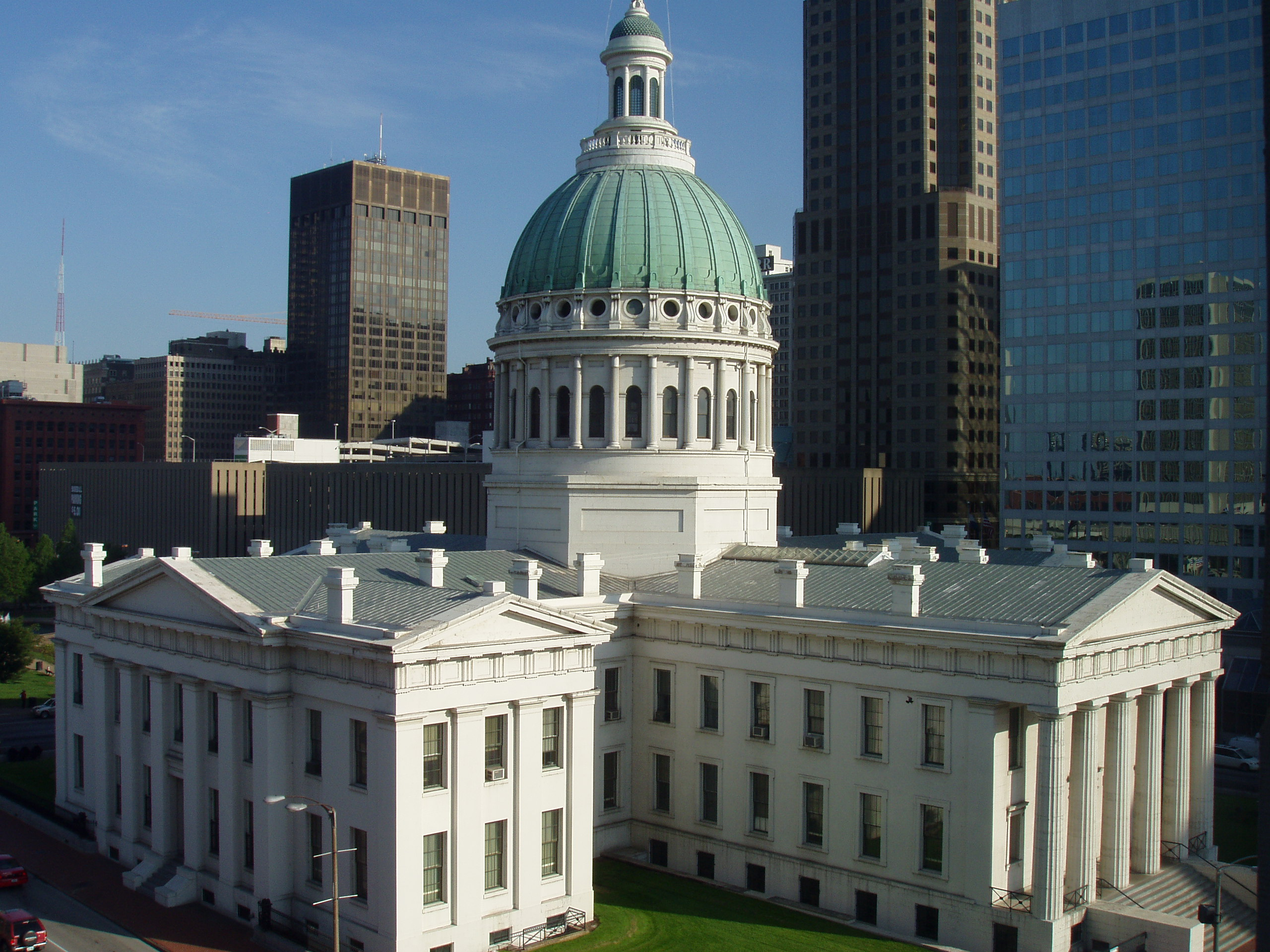
The St. Louis Courthouse, completed in 1828 after a land donation by Auguste Chouteau

After the end of the War of 1812, the population of St. Louis and the Missouri Territory began expanding quickly. Between 1804 and 1810, the town increased from 1,200 to 1,400, while from 1810 to 1820, the town population more than tripled from 1,400 to 4,600. It was during this influx of population that Auguste Chouteau and J.B.C. Lucas subdivided their land the west of Third Street, adding lots west through Seventh Street and doubling the width of the east-west streets. Chouteau and Lucas also donated a lot to be used as a county courthouse, where in 1828 the Old St. Louis County Courthouse was constructed.

The population increase also stirred interest in statehood for Missouri; nearly all of the St. Louis elites (both Creole and American) supported statehood as a way of increasing their political power in the region. In December 1818, Congress debated over the admission of Missouri, ending its debate with the Missouri Compromise and an Enabling Act in March 1820 that authorized Missouri to elect a state government and create a state constitution. The constitutional convention of Missouri began work on June 12, 1820 in the Mansion House Hotel on Third Street in St. Louis, completing and adopting the Missouri Constitution on July 19, 1820. After statehood, the first General Assembly met at the Missouri Hotel in St. Louis, where the legislature selected St. Charles as a temporary home for the state capital until Jefferson City was completed as the permanent capital. St. Louisans had "no apparent regrets" at their loss of capital status, as they made little attempt to garner it.

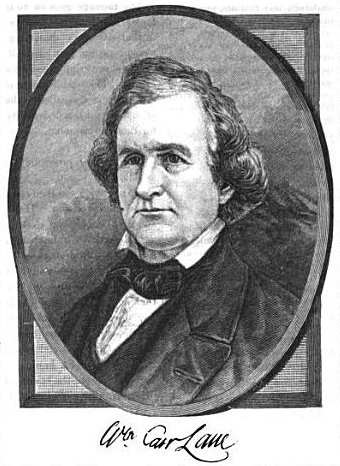
William Carr Lane, first mayor of St. Louis (1823–1826)

Among the early decisions of the General Assembly was to take up a petition from St. Louis for incorporation as a city with a charter. The first St. Louis city charter was approved by the legislature on December 9, 1822, which was subject to city voters approval (which then passed by a margin of 107 to 90). The first mayor of the city was a recently arrived American physician, William Carr Lane, who defeated city founder Auguste Chouteau by a vote of 122–70 in April 1823. A nine-member Board of Aldermen also were elected (replacing the earlier Board of Trustees), and the city limits were expanded west to Seventh Street and north and south by approximately 5 blocks each.

The focus of the early city government was on improvements to the riverfront and city health conditions. In 1823, the aldermen voted to regrade and pave Main (First) Street, and in 1824 voted for a general ordinance to pave streets and sidewalks and to create alleyways in all city blocks. However, the paving progress was slow and most streets remained dirt through the 1830s. In addition to the paving program, the aldermen voted to rename the streets, with north-south streets officially being given numbers, while east-west streets being named after trees.

== Catholic revival and growth of Protestantism in St. Louis ==
The transfer of Louisiana to the United States caused the Catholic Church in St. Louis considerable financial hardship; prior to the transfer, the Spanish government had paid all church operating expenses, and so no tithing was necessary among the citizens. Thus the resident priest of St. Louis left in 1804, and local Catholics were given periodic services by a traveling priest from Ste. Genevieve roughly six times a year until 1818. In spite of the problems, baptisms continued at the church in St. Louis, with roughly 400 whites and 100 blacks baptized between 1804 and 1816.

In 1815, Louis William Valentine Dubourg, the apostolic administrator of New Orleans, was assigned to the bishopric of the newly created Diocese of Louisiana and the Floridas (which had been separated from the Diocese of New Orleans, and he established his episcopal see in St. Louis. Upon his arrival in early January 1818, Bishop Dubourg ordered the demolition of the decayed log church built under Cruzat and replaced it with a brick church on the same church block. The new church, 135 by 40 feet in size, cost more than $24,000 and its interior was never completed, although the first mass was celebrated in it on December 25, 1819. Dubourg departed St. Louis to return to New Orleans permanently in 1822, but his recruitment of resident priests, establishment of a seminary, and the reconstruction of the church improved the standing of the Catholic Church in St. Louis. By 1826, a separate St. Louis diocese was created with Joseph Rosati named as the first bishop in 1827.

Protestants began to receive services in their homes led by itinerant ministers starting in the late 1790s, but most were quickly required to remove to American territory prior to the Louisiana Purchase. After the purchase, the Baptists organized a congregation in 1807 and built a log church in 1815 on Fee Fee Creek (well beyond St. Louis town limits). Only in 1818 was a Protestant church built within St. Louis, organized by Baptist missionary John Mason Peck with eleven members claiming membership in the First Baptist Church. Itinerant Methodist ministers also reached the town during the early years after the purchase, but only formed a congregation in 1821.

The third Protestant group to affect St. Louis was the Presbyterian Church, which was organized originally as a Bible reading society in 1811 by Charles Gratiot Sr., William C. Carr, and Stephen Hempstead (father of Edward Hempstead). Two Presbyterian missionaries preached in St. Louis in 1816, but it was only December 1817 before a church was organized. The fourth Protestant group to take root was the Episcopal Church, founded in 1825 when Thomas Horrell became the first rector of the Christ Church Episcopal Church. Regardless of the new churches and revival of Catholicism, however, most of the population was uninterested in organized religion or were agnostic.

== Early commerce and the Panic of 1819 ==
The commerce of the town after the Louisiana Purchase remained focused on the fur trade; trade operations in St. Louis were led by the Chouteau family and its alliance with the Osages and by Manuel Lisa and his Missouri Fur Company. These early operations largely depended on trading posts near Indian villages, where Indians and some white trappers could exchange furs for goods. Benefiting from the expertise of these traders was the Lewis and Clark Expedition, which left St. Louis in May 1804, reached the Pacific Ocean in the summer of 1805, and returned on September 23, 1806. The fur trade remained the basis of the wealth of elite St. Louis Creole families such as the Chouteaus well into the early 1820s.

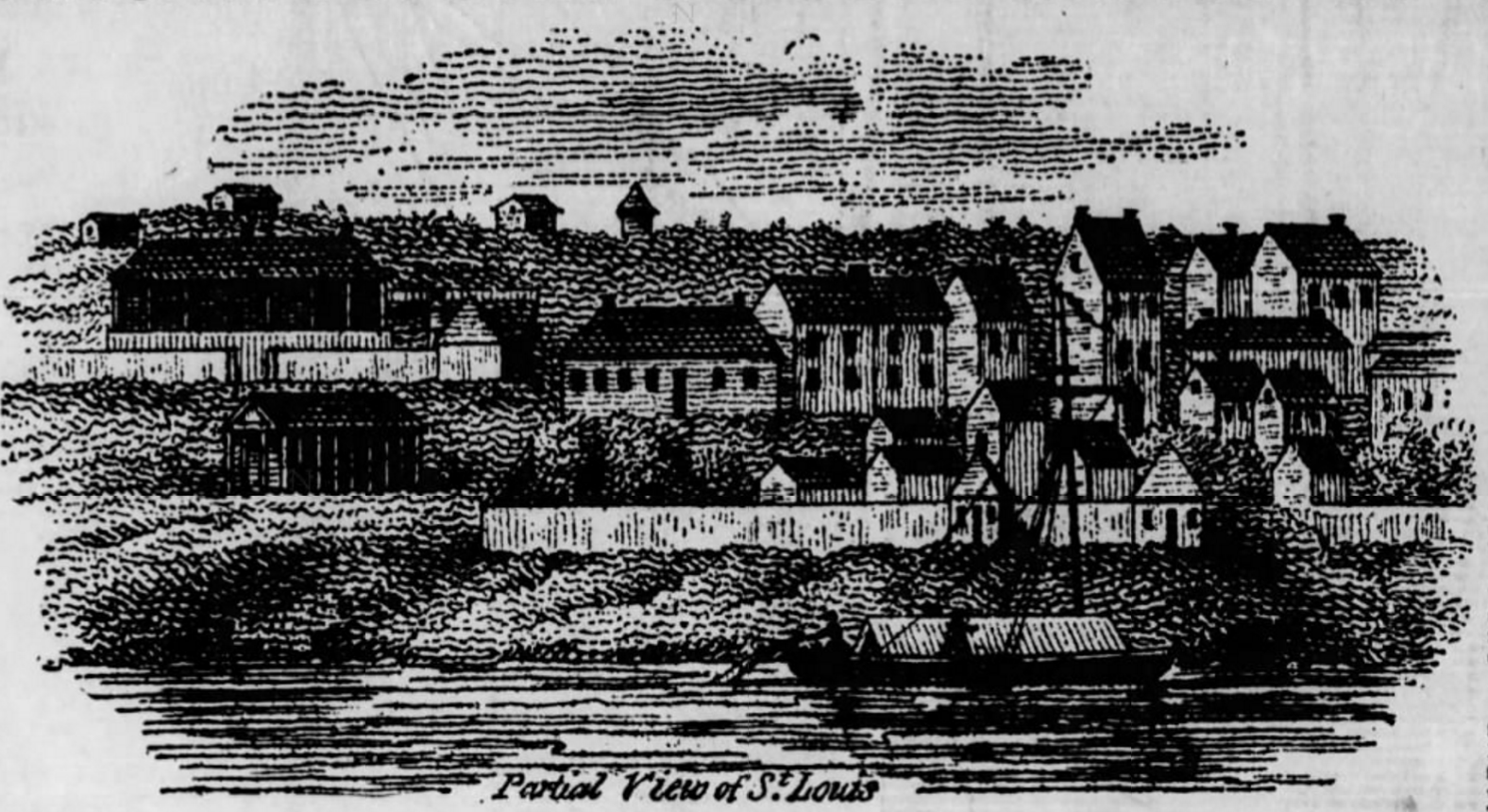
An 1814 photo engraving of the St. Louis fur trading post. The photo is believed to be the oldest of St. Louis as of at least 1964 according to the St. Louis Post Dispatch.

Starting in the early 1810s with the growth of American families moving to St. Louis, brick buildings began to be built in the town. Architecture reflected the American style as well, with more frame houses and log buildings than the Creole style of the original village. American business practices also took hold, with signage and advertising of services on buildings present by about 1810. These early American and immigrant families began opening new businesses, including printing and banking, starting in the 1810s.

Among the early printers to settle in St. Louis was an Irish immigrant named Joseph Charless, who published the first newspaper west of the Mississippi, the Missouri Gazette, in St. Louis on July 12, 1808. Charless printed government proceedings, international news, birth and death notices, and his own editorials, but generally refused to print information about duels.

Also during the 1810s, St. Louis merchants began facing the problem of too little bullion currency and an increase in the supply of unreliable paper currency issued by banks in Kentucky and Ohio. To improve upon the de facto barter economy of St. Louis, in December 1816 a group of merchants formed the Bank of St. Louis, which was chartered by the territorial legislature and accepted furs as collateral. However, the bank failed as a result of mismanagement and fraud on the part of its cashier. In early 1817, another group of merchants formed the Bank of Missouri, which initially was successful and became a United States depository bank with $150,000 in guaranteed deposits. However, the Second Bank of the United States contracted its currency policy in late 1818, causing the Panic of 1819 and the eventual closure of the Bank of Missouri.

The effect of the Panic of 1819 and subsequent depression slowed commercial activity in St. Louis until the mid-1820s. By 1824 and 1825, however, St. Louis businesses began outfitting an increasing number of farmers going west, while other merchants supplied military forces going to western outposts. St. Louis also had increasing connections with eastern markets after the introduction of the steamboat; the first steamboat to arrive in St. Louis, the Zebulon M. Pike, docked on August 2, 1817. By the time of the economic recovery of the mid-1820s, steamboats were common on the Mississippi and at the St. Louis docks. Rapids north of the city made St. Louis the northernmost navigable port for many large riverboats, and the Pike and other ships soon transformed St. Louis into a bustling inland port.

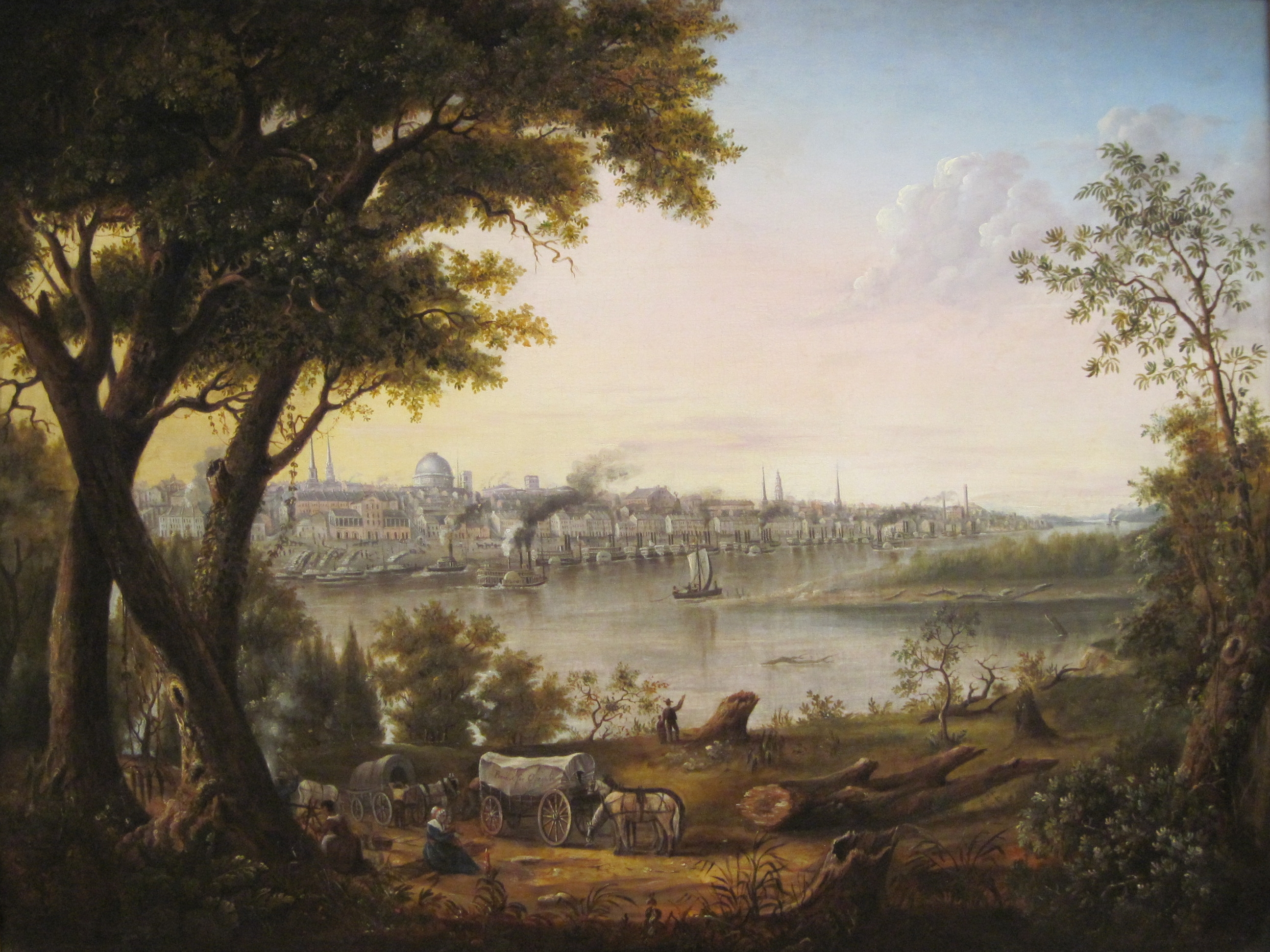
Saint Louis in 1846, painted by Henry Lewis.

== Antebellum economic expansion ==
Diversification in products available in St. Louis took place during the economic recovery, largely as a result of the new steamboat power. Confectioneries, jewelers, bookstores, musical instrument shops, lumber yards, and mortuaries all opened for the first time in the late 1820s and 1830s. Banking began to reestablish itself in the late 1830s with brokerage and insurance firms also offering deposits, until a banking crisis again forced liquidation of several companies in the early 1840s. Wholesalers also began to operate during the 1830s, supplying retail establishments from large company warehouses in the city. The city's Merchants Exchange, founded in 1836, was the first commodity-trading exchange in the United States. Also, the fur trade continued as a major commercial venture through the 1820s and into the 1830s.

After the Panic of 1819 and the economic depression, the fur trade had shifted from being based on trading with Indians and trappers to one based on directly trapping and shipping furs. Among the pioneers of this method was the company known as the Rocky Mountain Fur Company, which departed from St. Louis in April 1822 and included mountain men such as Jim Bridger, Jedediah Smith, Thomas Fitzpatrick, Jim Beckwourth, and Etienne Provost. The Rocky Mountain group eventually was forced from business by the American Fur Company, owned by John Jacob Astor, but the western fur trade remained headquartered in St. Louis. However, by the late 1830s and early 1840s, changes in fashion meant that beaver fur no longer was in demand, although St. Louis continued as a hub of buffalo hides and other furs.

As commercial trade resumed, so did construction and physical development of the city. The construction of the Old St. Louis County Courthouse in the late 1820s encouraged other growth, with an addition of western lots to Ninth Street and a new city hall adjacent to the river in 1833. Between 1833 and 1845, another 31 additions were made to the city, extending the western edge to 14th Street. The military post at Fort Bellefontaine (north of the city along the Missouri River) moved and expanded in 1826 to Jefferson Barracks, roughly ten miles south of St. Louis on the Mississippi River. In tandem, the army purchased 37 acres three miles south of the city to build an armory, prompting an industrial addition and railroad line south to Iron Mountain, Missouri. Another addition to the north of the city connected the town of Bremen, which was then annexed by St. Louis

The 1830s saw dramatic growth in the city's population: by 1830, the city population had increased to 5,832 from roughly 4,500 in 1820. By 1835, the city population reached 8,316, doubled by 1840 to 16,439, doubled again by 1845 to 35,390, and again by 1850 to 77,860. By 1850, St. Louis had become the largest U.S. city west of Pittsburgh, Pennsylvania, and the second-largest port in the country, with a commercial tonnage exceeded only by New York City.

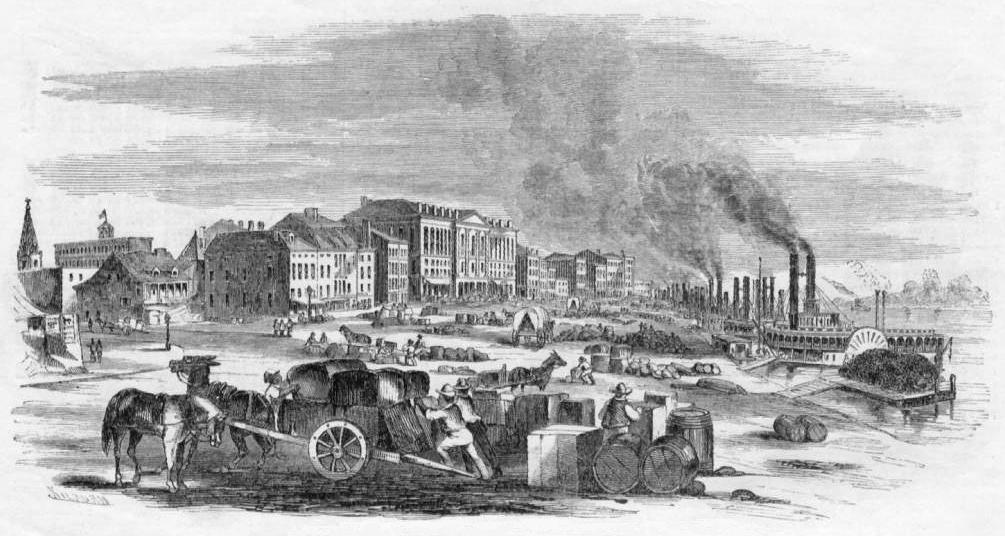
The St. Louis levee on the Mississippi River in 1857

== Infrastructure improvements ==
In large part due to the rapid growth of the 1830s and 1840s, cholera became a significant problem in St. Louis. In December 1848, cholera cases were reported after several steamboats crowded with immigrants likely brought the disease. In the spring and summer of 1849, cholera spread throughout the population to epidemic proportions, killing nearly 5,000 people. As a solution to the cholera problem, city officials constructed a sewer system to drain sinkholes that had become clogged with sewage and garbage. In addition to the nearly 31 miles of sewer pipe built by 1861, cemeteries were removed to the outskirts of the town to Bellefontaine Cemetery and Calvary Cemetery to reduce groundwater contamination, and a large mill pond was drained in 1851.

In the same year of the 1849 cholera epidemic, a large fire broke out on a steamboat on the levee, spread to 23 other boats, then destroyed a large portion of the center city. Property losses were estimated at $6.1 million, while thousands became unemployed, hundreds lost their homes, and dozens of major businesses were destroyed. In response to the fire, streets were widened, the wharf was improved, and a new building code required structures to be built of stone or brick.

The levee also saw significant improvement during the 1850s. In the first half of the 19th century, a second channel developed in the Mississippi River at St. Louis. An island (nicknamed Bloody Island for the duels fought there) formed between the two channels, and a smaller island (Duncan's Island) developed below St. Louis. It was feared that the levee at St. Louis might be left high and dry, and federal assistance was sought and obtained with a grant of $50,000 in 1851. Using the engineering planning of Robert E. Lee, levees were constructed in 1852 and 1853 on the Illinois side to direct water toward Missouri and eliminate the second channel, joining Bloody Island to the land on the Illinois side and washing away Duncan's Island by 1855.

One final component of city infrastructure that was created before the Civil War was the city's water system. Originally, city residents used river water, hauled directly from the riverbank slightly north of the city. Starting in 1830, a pumping station and reservoir was built on top of a Native American mound, but it quickly became inadequate to the city's needs. In 1843 and 1845 the station and reservoir were expanded, but again proved inadequate. Four new reservoirs were built between 1849 and 1860, but prior to the Civil War, there was no significant improvement in water quality or supply.

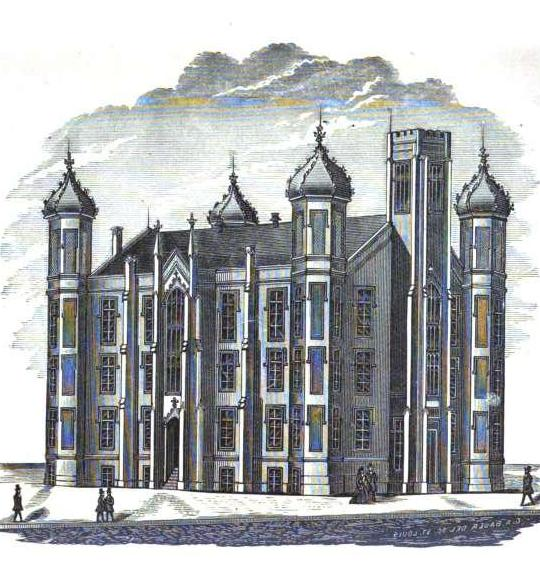
Central High School, built in 1855 at the northeast corner of Olive and 15th streets, was the first public high school in St. Louis.

== Education before the Civil War ==
Joseph Charless, printer of the Missouri Gazette, also published the first book in the Missouri Territory (about territorial laws) and operated a bookstore. In addition, most wealthy individuals in St. Louis also owned private book collections. However, a sizable proportion of adults remained illiterate.

Early schools in St. Louis were all fee-based and mostly conducted lessons in French. The first substantial educational effort came about under the authority of the Catholic Church, which in 1818 opened Saint Louis Academy, later renamed Saint Louis University, offering courses in divinity, philosophy, languages, and mathematics. However, the academy primarily catered to seminary students rather than the general public. Later, in the 1840s and 1850s, Catholic schools offered education to more than 3,000 students in at least ten parochial schools.

Public education in St. Louis began in 1838, when the city Board of Aldermen voted to levy a common lands income tax to support two elementary schools, known as North and South schools. A third school opened in 1841, called Benton School, offering instruction in basic writing, reading, and mathematics. Initially the schools required students to pay fees, but by 1847 tax levies allowed for free public education and expansion of the system. By 1854, the system had 27 schools and served nearly 4,000 students, in 1855 a high school was opened with considerable fanfare, and by 1860, nearly 12,000 students had enrolled in the St. Louis Public Schools. The district also opened a normal school in 1857, which later became Harris-Stowe State University.

== Slavery and racism in St. Louis ==
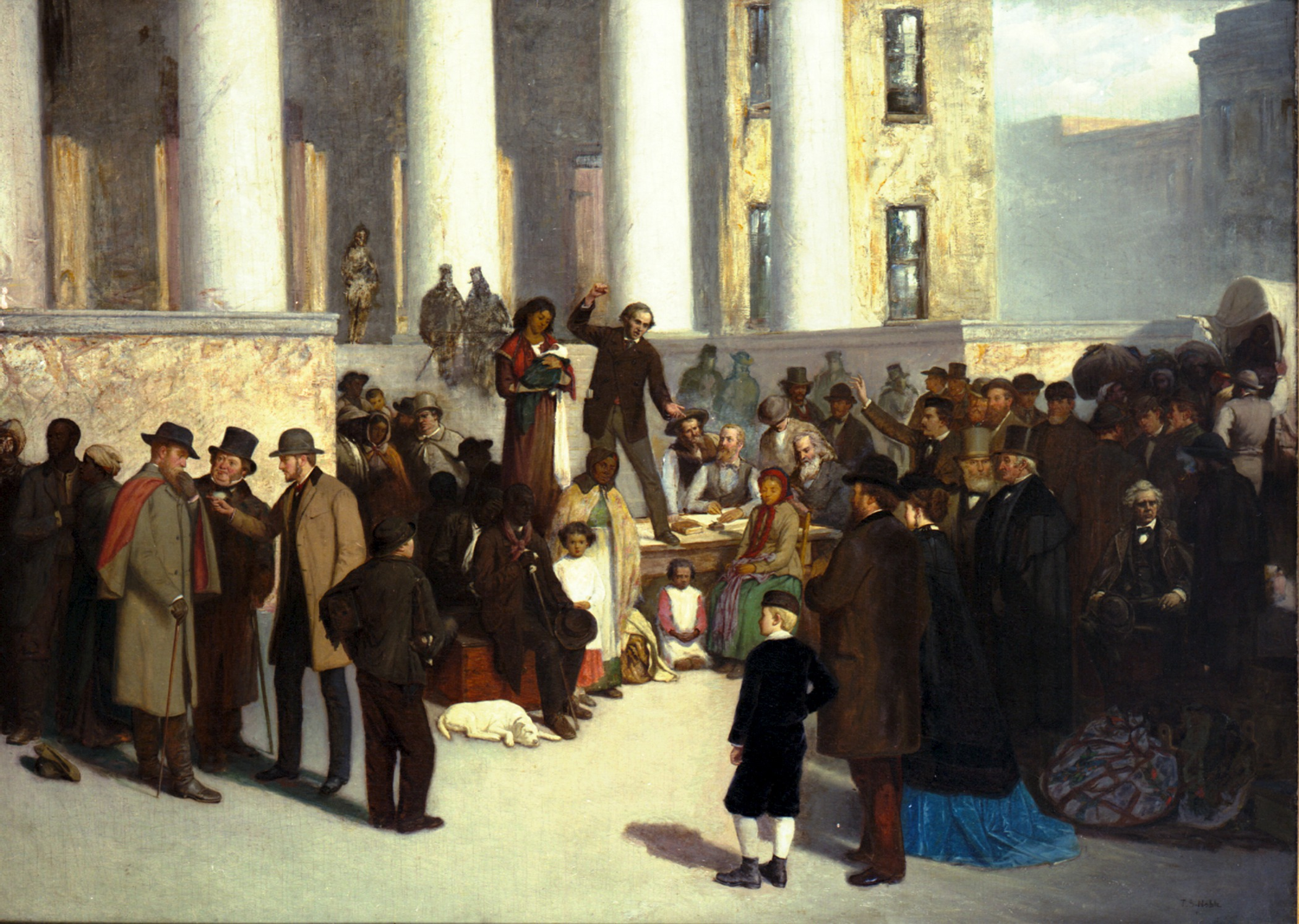
Slave auction in 1861 in Saint-Louis, by Thomas Satterwhite Noble

Missouri was admitted as a slave state in 1821. Many slaveholders had migrated to the territory from Kentucky and Tennessee, and settled with slaves along the central Missouri River, in an area that became known as "Little Dixie", as well as in the delta area of the Bootheel. Many free blacks and slaves lived and worked in St. Louis, as domestics, artisans, crew on the riverboats and laborers at the wharves.

After the admission of Missouri as a slave state, the owning and sale of slaves continued in St. Louis, although as the town grew, the percentage of the population held as slaves declined. The treatment of slaves in St. Louis as compared with other areas is unclear; some evidence suggests mild to harsh treatment, and it is clear that many slaves attempted to escape. Slave sales occurred usually through advertising in newspapers, with transactions conducted in hotels or private homes. Slaves often were held in the St. Louis jail prior to their movement to a particular farm or to a dealer. Many slaves worked on steamboats as crew or as laborers on the riverfront, and some escaped across the river to the free state of Illinois, continuing via the Underground Railroad to Canada. Some slaves also were hired out by their owners for farm or commercial work for periods of up to a year.

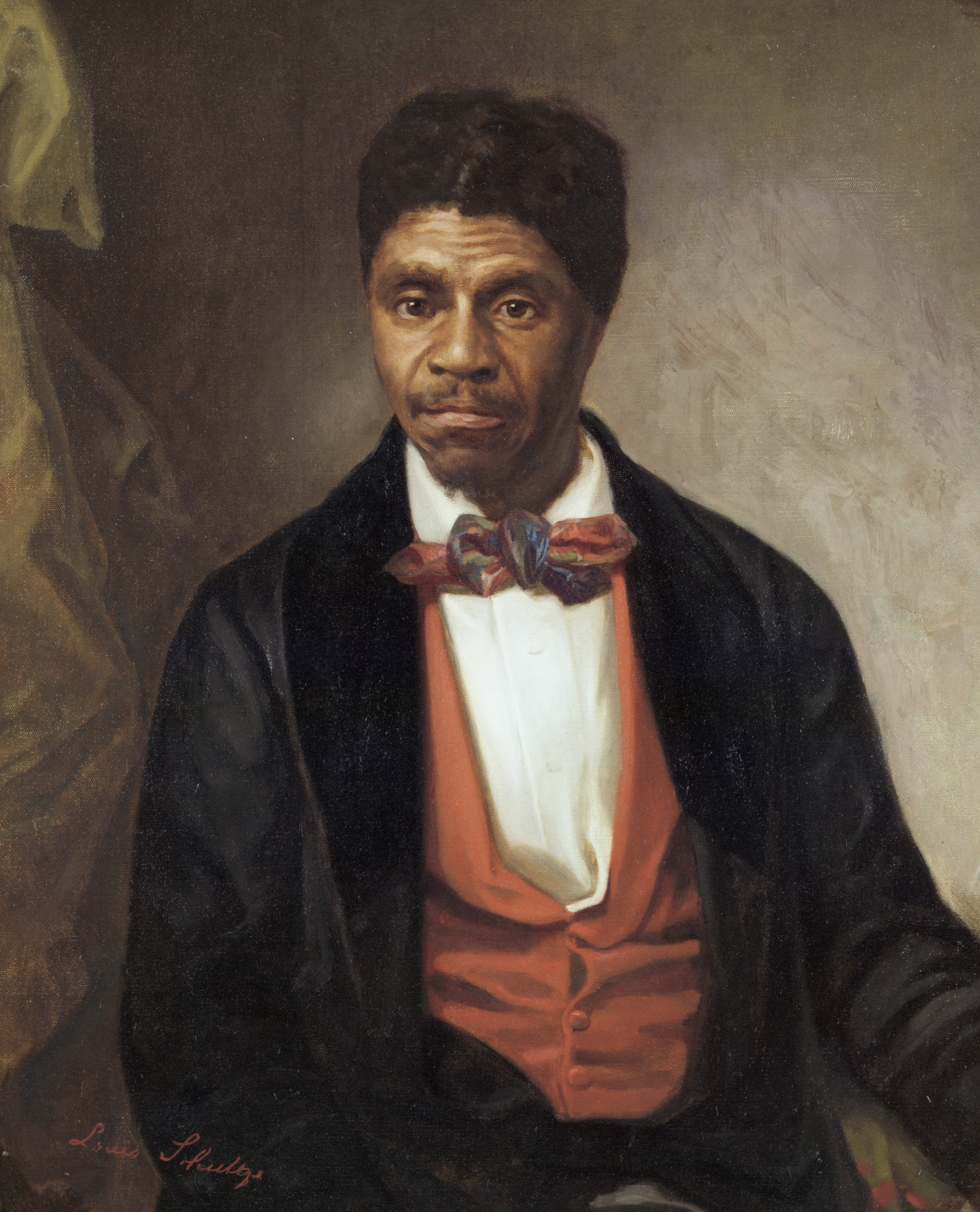
Dred Scott, whose famous case to gain his freedom began as a lawsuit filed in St. Louis in 1846

The availability of work meant that slaves could earn wages, and some were able to save money to purchase their freedom or that of relatives. One such example was that of John Berry Meachum, a cooper who purchased his own freedom, then worked to purchase his family and others from slavery. Meachum later became a Baptist minister and founded the African Baptist Church of St. Louis. Other slaves were freed via manumission after some period of service, such as was the case of a slave named Francis who was emancipated by Auguste Chouteau in 1826. From 1828 to 1865, just under 1,000 slaves gained their freedom, out of a total population of slaves never higher than 2,600.

In addition to the practice of manumission and self-emancipation, some slaves gained their freedom through freedom suits, lawsuits allowed under an 1824 Missouri state law designed to protect free blacks from enslavement by allowing them to sue for their freedom. Among the earliest of these freedom suits was brought by the Scypion family. Marie Jean Scypion, an enslaved half Indian, should technically have been freed at the beginning of Spanish rule in the 1760s with the O'Reilly decree; in 1805, her daughter Marguerite sued for freedom and initially won in court, a decision which was reversed by the Missouri Territorial Court. After statehood, Tayon sold the family to Jean Pierre Chouteau (brother of Auguste Chouteau). In 1825, Marguerite again filed a freedom suit, this time under the 1824 Missouri state law. After several appeals, including to the Missouri Supreme Court and the U.S. Supreme Court, Marguerite Scypion won her case in 1836, freeing the Scypion family and ending Indian slavery in Missouri.

The 1838 lynching of Francis McIntosh, a free Black man who worked on a boat that docked in St. Louis, was followed by a trial that acquitted all perpetrators. The affair was covered by abolitionist newspaper St. Louis Observer, whose owner Elijah Lovejoy moved to Alton, Illinois following vandalism and threats of violence and was shortly thereafter murdered alongside the destruction of his press. Both the trial and murder were later mentioned in Abraham Lincoln's Lyceum address as a sign of disregard of legal process and destruction of faith in institutions.

In 1846, the slaves Dred Scott and his wife Harriet sued for freedom, in a case heard at the Old Courthouse, based on their having traveled and lived with their master in free states. Although the state ruled in his favor, an appeal to the U.S. Supreme Court resulted in an 1857 ruling against them. The Supreme Court ruled that slaves could not be counted as citizens. This decision overturned the basis of the Missouri Compromise. The year of the decision, both of the Scotts were emancipated by their master's family.

Including the Scypion family case and the Dred Scott case, three hundred and one freedom suits were filed in St. Louis courts from 1814 to 1860. However, slaves gained freedom in less than half of them.

== Immigration and nativism in St. Louis ==
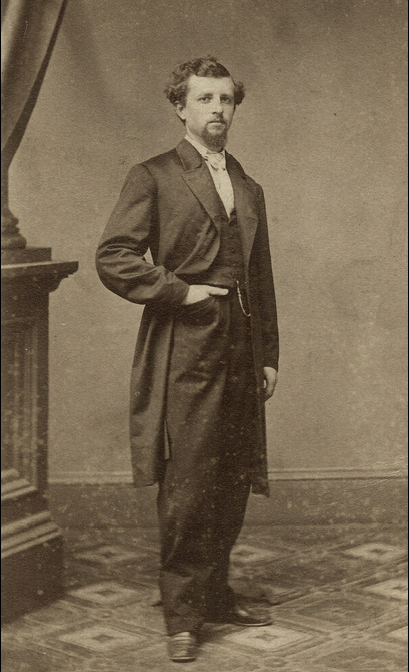
Adolphus Busch, photographed by fellow German-Americans Hermann Hoelke and Robert Benecke, c. 1860s

During the economic expansion of the 1830s, Irish and German immigration to St. Louis increased substantially. In particular, the writings of Gottfried Duden encouraged German immigration to the Midwest, and St. Louis in particular. By the early 1830s the German population of St. Louis had become significant enough to be regarded as a bloc by the Americans and French. Indeed, on a single day in December 1833 more than 500 immigrants from Germany arrived in the town. German immigration continued in the 1840s and 1850s, particularly after the failure of the Revolutions of 1848.

The second major group of pre-Civil War immigrants came from Ireland, including both Catholic and Protestant Irish. Although in other regions Irish immigrants were equated with poverty during the 1820s and 1830s, the early Irish community of St. Louis in the 1830s often included wealthy, politically powerful and influential members, such as John Mullanphy, Alexander McNair, and John O'Fallon. However, starting in the mid-1840s large numbers of Irish fled poverty abroad and arrived in St. Louis with little money or skills. Many of these Irish were motivated by the Great Famine of 1845–1846 and the failed Irish uprising of 1848.

Nativist sentiment increased in St. Louis during the late 1840s, leading to a mob attack in 1844 on Saint Louis University and attacks on naturalized citizens in the April 1844 election. However, the increased number of naturalized citizens led to the election of Democratic mayors supportive of the immigrants in 1847, 1848 and 1849. In spite of this, nativist sentiments led to another riot in 1849, in which nativist mobs attacked immigrants and their property. In a third riot that took place in 1852, German immigrants were accused of attacking nativist Whig Party supporters at a polling place in Soulard Market For its part, the Whig Party was supported with the wealthy Creoles and Irish leaders of St. Louis, and Germans had accused the Whigs of discrimination.

However, the worst nativist riot in St. Louis, which took place in 1854, combined the problems of anti-immigration and the slavery issue. Thomas Hart Benton, who had formerly been a Missouri senator, was running for reelection as U.S. representative of Missouri's 1st congressional district. Benton was a solid member of the Democratic Party and was supported by newly naturalized and lower-class Germans and Irish. He faced Luther M. Kennett, who had garnered the support of the disintegrating Whig Party (including the wealthy St. Louis elite class) and the nativist Know Nothing movement. On August 7, 1854, election day in St. Louis, a nativist mob began attacking Democratic Irish voters and Irish property in south St. Louis. The Irish began fighting back, when the riot moved to the riverfront where dockworkers began fighting the nativist mob, which had grown in size to several thousand. The Irish and dockworkers retreated to boarding houses, at which point the nativists began attacking Saint Louis University and German newspaper offices. The St. Louis police department and local militia eventually quelled the riot, though not before 10 were killed, 33 wounded, and 93 buildings were damaged. Regulations on elections (such as closing saloons on election day) prevented fighting in future elections in 1856 and 1858.

== St. Louis in the American Civil War ==
Militarily, the Civil War (1861–1865) barely touched St. Louis; the area saw only a few skirmishes in which Union forces prevailed. But the war shut down trade with the South, devastating the city's economy. Missouri was nominally a slave state, but its economy did not depend on slavery, and it never seceded from the Union. The areas of "Little Dixie" and the border with Kansas were a base for insurgency and guerrilla activity during the war. The state also had people who resisted slavery, as with the foundation of the militant Knights of Liberty in 1846. The arsenal at St. Louis was used during the war to construct ironclad ships for the Union.
