= List of governors in the Viceroyalty of New Spain =

Governors in the various provinces of the Viceroyalty of New Spain.

In addition to governors, the following list (under construction) intends to give an overview of colonial units of the provincial level; therefore it also includes some offices of similar rank, especially the intendant. Intendente is both a Spanish and Portuguese word, derived from the French Intendant. It was introduced to the Spanish Empire by the Bourbon Dynasty, which Spain shared with France after the early 18th century. This list also does not distinguish between Gobernaciones and Provincias, because they were essentially two grades of provinces.

== Provinces under the Real Audiencia of Santo Domingo ==
- Under the judicial jurisdiction of the Real Audiencia of Santo Domingo and the administrative supervision of its President-Captain General with great autonomy from the Viceroy of New Spain.

=== Island of Santo Domingo ===
- 1492–1499 Christopher Columbus, as Governor or Viceroy of the Indies.
- 1499–1502 Francisco de Bobadilla, as Governor of the Indies.
- 1502–1509 Nicolás de Ovando y Cáceres, as Governor of the Indies.
- 1509–1518 Diego Columbus, as Governor of the Indies until 1511, thereafter as Viceroy of the Indies.
- 1526 Real Audiencia of Santo Domingo established.
- 1536 Viceroyalty of the Indies purchased by Crown from Luis Colón. Santo Domingo directly administered by the President-Captain General of the Audiencia of Santo Domingo.
- 1795–1808 Spanish part of the Island ceded to France in the Peace of Basel. Island ceases to be a Spanish possession.
- 1808–1821 After local revolts and subsequent defeat of the French, Santo Domingo realigns itself with Spain. Yet, this is the era of "Foolish Spain" and the colony is loosely held.
- 1821–1844 Haitian occupation of Santo Domingo by Jean-Pierre Boyer
- 1844–1861 Birth of the Dominican Republic as an independent country, yet due to fears of re invasion by the Haitian Armies, Dominican Republic realigns itself with Spain.
- 1861–1865 Territory is re-Colonized by Spain and Pedro Santana is appointed Governor and Captain General of the Colony of Dominican Republic.
- 1865 Dominican Republic is restored as a sovereign nation.

=== Island of Cuba ===
- See List of colonial heads of Cuba.
- 1510 Conquered by Diego Velázquez de Cuéllar, who becomes first Governor.
- 1511 Settlers create Municipality of Barbacoa to separate Island from the Viceroyalty of Diego Columbus.
- 1607 Governor given additional office of Captain General. Pedro Váldez first Governor-Captain General.
- 1765 Independent Intendancy created for the Island. First Intendant was Miguel de Altarriba.
- 1795 Audiencia of Santo Domingo moves to Cuba; becomes Audiencia of Puerto Príncipe.
- 1821 Collapse of the Viceroyalty of New Spain makes Island of Cuba principal possession of the Spanish Monarchy in America.

=== Island of Puerto Rico ===
- See List of governors of Puerto Rico.
- Under the jurisdiction of the Audiencia of Santo Domingo.
- 1508 First settlement established by Juan Ponce de León, who becomes first Governor.
- 1511 Island returned to the Viceroyalty of Diego Columbus.
- 1536 Crown purchases Viceroyalty from Luis Colón, Diego's son.
- 1536–1545 Each half of the Island administered by the Alcaldes of San Juan and San Germán.
- 1545 Governorship reestablished.
- 1580 Governor given additional office of Captain General.
- 1784 Governor-Captain General given additional office of Intendant.
- 1821 Collapse of Viceroyalty of New Spain. Island of Puerto Rico under the jurisdiction of the Audiencia of Puerto Príncipe, Cuba.

=== Province of Florida (1699–1763) ===
- See List of colonial governors of Florida.

Intendancy issues handled by the Cuban Intendancy starting in 1763.

- 1565 Granted right to communicate directly to the Council of the Indies. Florida overseen by President of the Audiencia of Santo Domingo until subordinated to Cuba in 1763.
- 10 February 1763 Traded to Britain (exchanged for Cuba); division into two colonies, East Florida and West Florida.
- 9 May 1781 West Florida retaken by Spain.
- 23 September 1783 East and West Florida formally returned to Spain (subordinated to Cuba).
- 27 October 1785 Northern boundary of Florida established by the Treaty of San Lorenzo/Pinckney's Treaty.
- 22 February 1819 Ceded to U.S. by Adams-Onís Treaty.

=== Province of Nueva Andalucía ===
- Under the jurisdiction of the Audiencia of Santo Domingo until the creation of the Viceroyalty of New Granada in 1739.
- 1536 Province of New Andalusia created.
- 1568 New Andalusia joined with neighboring Province of Paria; first Governor Diego Hernández de Serpa.
- 1739 Under the jurisdiction of the Audiencia of Bogotá in judicial matters.
- 1739–1777 Maintained under the administration of the President of the Audiencia of Santo Domingo.
- 1777 Under the jurisdiction of the Audiencia of Santo Domingo in judicial matters; under the Captain General of Venezuela in administrative matters.
- 1786 Under the jurisdiction of the Audiencia of Caracas in judicial matters.

=== Louisiana (1762-1802) ===
- See List of colonial governors of Louisiana
- 23 November 1762 Ceded by France by Treaty of Fontainebleau
- 21 March 1801 Retroceded to France by Treaty of Aranjuez.

== Provinces of New Spain ==
=== Province of Vera Cruz ===
- Under the jurisdiction of the Audiencia of Mexico.
- 1787 Intendencia of Vera Cruz, part of New Spain.
- 1821 Part of independent Mexico.
- 1824 Transformed into State of Veracruz.

==== Intendants of Vera Cruz ====
- 1787–1790 Pedro de Corbalán
- 1790–1794 Pedro Fernández de Gorositza y Lorea
- 1794–1796 Pedro Ponce
- 1796–1799 Diego García Panes
- 1799–1810 García Dávila
- 1810–1812 Carlos de Urrutia y Montoya
- 1812–1814 Pedro Telmo Landero
- 1814–1815 José de Quevedo
- 1816–1818 José Dávila (First time)
- 1818–1819 Pascual Sebastián de Liñán y Dolz de Espejo
- 1819–1821 José Dávila (Second time)

=== Kingdom of Mexico or New Spain ===
- Administered directly by the Viceroy and the Real Audiencia of Mexico; see List of viceroys of New Spain.
- See Spanish conquest of the Aztec Empire for early history.

=== Province of Puebla ===
- Under the jurisdiction of the Audiencia of Mexico.
- 1787 Intendencia of Puebla established.
- 1821 Part of independent Mexico.
- 1824 Puebla transformed into the State of Puebla.
- 1846 as a State 49 of the United States
- 1898 as a State 18 of the Mexico

==== Intendants of Puebla ====
- 1787–1811 Manuel Flón y Tejada, conde de la Cadena
- 1811–1812 García Dávila
- 1812 Santiago de Irissari
- 1812–1813 Prudencio de Guadalfajara y Aguilera, conde de Castro Terreño
- 1814 Ramón Díaz Ortega
- 1814–1815 José Moreno y Daioz
- 1815–1816 Joaquín Estévez
- 1816–1821 Ciriaco del Llano

=== Province of Oaxaca ===
- Under the jurisdiction of the Audiencia of Mexico.
- 1521 Marquisate of the Valley of Oaxaca created for Hernán Cortés.
- 1787 Intendencia of Oaxaca, part of New Spain.
- 1821 Part of independent Mexico.

==== Intendants Oaxaca ====
- 1787–1808 Antonio de Mora y Peysal
- 1808–1810 Antonio María Izquierdo de la Torre
- 1810–1814 Joseph María Lazo y Nacarino
- 1814–1816 Francisco Rendón (First time)
- 1816–1818 Antonio Basilio Gutiérrez de Ulloa
- 1818–1821 Francisco Rendón (Second time)

=== Province of Valladolid ===
- Under the jurisdiction of the Audiencia of Mexico.
- 1787 Intendencia of Valladolid created.
- 1821 Part of independent Mexico.
- 1824 Valladolid transformed into State of Michoacán.

==== Intendants of Valladolid ====
- 1787–1791 Juan Antonio de Riaño y Bárcena de los Cuentos y Velarde
- 1797–1808 Felipe Díaz de Ortega Bustillo
- 1810–1821 Manuel Merino y Moreno

=== Province of Guanajuato ===
- Under the jurisdiction of the Audiencia of Mexico.
- 1787 Intendecia of Guanajuato created.
- 1821 Part of independent Mexico.

==== Intendants of Guanajuato ====
- 1787–1790 Andrés de Amat y Torosa
- 1790–1792 Pedro José Soriano
- 1792–1810 Juan Antonio Riaño y Barcena de los Cuentos y Velarde
- 1810–1821 Fernando Pérez Marañón

=== Province of San Luis Potosí ===
- Under the jurisdiction of the Audiencia of Mexico.
- 1787 Intendencia of San Luis Potosí created.
- 1821 Part of independent Mexico.

==== Intendants of San Luis Potosí ====
- 1787–1799 Bruno Díaz de Alcedo
- 1799–1800 Vicente Bernabeu
- 1800–1804 Onésimo Antonio Durán
- 1804–1805 Manuel Ampudía
- 1805–1809 José Ignacio Vélez
- 1809–1810 José Ruíz de Aguirre
- 1810–1821 Manuel Jacinto de Acevedo

=== Province of Yucatán (Mérida) ===
- 1517 Claimed for Spain.
- 1519 Spanish colonization of the Yucatán peninsula begins.
- 1527–1543 Province of Yucatán, subordinated to Nueva España (see Mexico).
- 1543–1549 Subordinated to the Kingdom of Guatemala (autonomous part of the Viceroyalty).
- 1543–1560 Part of Captaincy of Gracias (Yucatán, Chiapas, Tabasco, Panama and Central America).
- 1549–1550 Subordinated to Nueva España.
- 1550–1560 Subordinated to Guatemala.
- 1560 Subordinated to Nueva España.
- 1617 Captaincy General of Yucatán established.
- 1787 Intendencia of Mérida created.
- 28 September 1821 Part of independent Mexico.
- 1824 Yucatán transformed into a state.

==== Governors Yucatán ====
- 1526–1540 Francisco de Montejo (First time)
- 1540–1546 Francisco de Montejo, El Mozo (the younger)
- 1546–1549 Francisco de Montejo (Second time)
- 1549–1565 The Alcaldes of Mérida
- 1565–1571 Luis de Céspedes y Oviedo
- 1571–1573 Diego de Santillán
- 1573–1577 Francisco de Solís
- 1577–1582 Guillén de las Casas
- 1582–1586 Francisco de Solís
- 1586–1593 Antonio de Vozmediano
- 1593–1595 Alonso Ordóñez de Nevares
- 1595–1596 Pablo Higueras de la Cerda
- 1596–1597 Carlos Sámano y Quiñónes
- 1597–1604 Diego Fernández de Velasco y Enríquez de Almansa
- 1604–1612 Carlos de Luna y Arellano
- 1612–1617 Antonio de Figueroa y Bravo
- 1617–1619 Francisco Ramírez Briceño
- 1619–1620 The Alcaldes of Mérida
- 1620–1621 Arias de Losada y Taboada
- 1621–1628 Diego de Cardenas y Balda
- 1628–1630 Juan de Vargas Machuca
- 1631–1633 Fernando Centeño Maldonaldo (First time)
- 1633–1635 Jerónimo de Quero y Jiménez
- 1635–1636 Fernando Centeño Maldonaldo (Second time)
- 1636–1643 Diego Zapata de Cárdenas, marqués de Santo Floro
- 1643–1644 Francisco Núñez Melián
- 1644–1645 Enrique de Ávila Pacheco (First time)
- 1645–1648 Esteban de Azcárraga y Veytias
- 1648–1650 Enrique de Ávila Pacheco (Second time)
- 1650–1652 García Valdés de Osorio Dóriga y Tiñeo, marqués de Peñalba
- 1652–1653 Martín Roble y Villfañe
- 1653–1655 Pedro Saenz Izquierdo
- 1655–1660 Francisco de Bazán
- 1660–1662 José Campero y Campos
- 1663–1664 Juan Francisco Esquivel y de la Rosa (First time)
- 1664 Rodrigo de Flores y Aldana (First time)
- 1664–1667 Juan Francisco Esquivel y de la Rosa (Second time)
- 1667–1669 Rodrigo de Flores y Aldana (Second time)
- 1669–1670 Frutos Delgado
- 1670–1672 Fernando Francisco de Escobedo
- 1672–1674 Miguel Cordornio de Sola
- 1674–1677 Sancho Fernández de Angulo y Sandoval
- 1677–1683 Antonio de Layseca y Alvarado de la Ronda
- 1683–1688 Juan Bruno Téllez de Guzmán
- 1688–1693 Juan José de la Bárcena
- 1693–1699 Roque Soberanis y Centeño
- 1699–1703 Martín de Urzúa y Arizmendi, count of Lizárraga (first term)
- 1703–1706 Álvaro de Rivaguda Enciso y Luyando
- 1706–1708 Martín de Urzúa y Arizmendi, count of Lizárraga (second term)
- 1708–1712 Fernando de Meneses y Bravo de Saravia
- 1712–1715 Alonso de Meneses y Bravo de Saravia
- 1715–1720 Juan Jose de Vertiz y Ontanón
- 1720–1724 Antonio Cortaire y Terreros
- 1724–1733 Antonio de Figueroa y Silva Lasso de la Vega Ladrón del Niño de Guevara
- 1733–1734 Juan Fernández de Sabariego
- 1734–1736 Santiago de Aguirre Negro y Estrada Martínez de Maturana y Estrada
- 1736–1743 Manuel Ignacio Salcedo y Sierra Alta y Rado y Bedia
- 1743–1750 Anontio de Benevides
- 1750–1752 Juan José de Clou, marqués de Iscar
- 1752–1758 Melchor de Navarrette
- 1758–1761 Alonso Fernández de Heredia
- 1761–1762 José Crespo y Honorato
- 1762–1763 Antonio Ainz de Ureta
- 1763 José Álvarez
- 1763–1764 Felipe Ramírez de Estenoz
- 1764–1771 Cristóbal de Zayas
- 1771–1777 Antonio de Oliver
- 1778–1779 Hugo Ocónor Cunco y Fali
- 1779–1783 Roberto Rivas Betancourt
- 1783–1789 José Marino y Ceballos

==== Governor-Intendants of Mérida ====
- 1789–1793 Lucas de Gálvez
- 1793–1800 Arturo O' Neil y O' Kelly
- 1800–1811 Benito Pérez Brito de los Ríos y Fernández Valdelomar
- 1812–1815 Manuel Artazo y Torredemer
- 1815–1820 Miguel Castro y Araoz
- 1820–1821 Mariano Carrillo y Albornoz
- 1821 Juan María Echéverri

== Kingdom of Nueva Galicia (Guadalajara) ==
- 1531 Nueva Galicia conquered and created by Nuño Beltrán de Guzmán, first President of the Real Audiencia of Mexico.
- 1535 Viceroyalty established, Antonio de Mendoza first Viceroy.
- 1545 Alcaldia Mayor of Nueva Galicia established.
- 1549 Audiencia of Nueva Galicia established; administration given to Audiencia President.
- 1787 Intendencia of Guadalajara created; Audiencia Presidency becomes a judicial role.
- 1821 Intendancy of Guadalajara part of independent Mexico.
- 1824 Guadalajara becomes State of Jalisco.

=== Province of New Galicia ===
==== Governor-Presidents of Guadalajara ====
- 1679–1702 Alonso de Ceballos y Villagutierre
- 1702–1703 Antonio Hipólito de Abarca Vidal y Valda
- 1703–1708 Juan de Escalante Colombres y Mendoza
- 1708–1716 Toribio Rodríguez de Solís
- 1716–1724 Tomás Terán de los Ríos
- 1724–1727 Nicolás Rivera y Santa Cruz
- 1727–1732 Tomás Rivera y Santa Cruz
- 1732–1737 José Barragán de Burgos
- 1737–1743 Francisco de Aiza, marqués del Castillo de Aiza
- 1743–1751 Fermín de Echevers y Subiza
- 1751–1760 José de Basarte y Borán
- 1760–1761 Francisco Galindo Quiñónes y Barrientos (First time)
- 1761–1764 Pedro Montesinos de Lara
- 1764–1771 Francisco Galindo Quiñónes y Barrientos (Second time)
- 1771–1776 Eusebio Sánchez Pareja y Beleño (First time)
- 1776–1777 Ruperto Vicente de Luyando
- 1777–1786 Eusebio Sánchez Pareja y Beleño (Second time)

==== Governor-Intendants of Guadalajara ====
- 1787–1791 Antonio de Villaurrutia y Salcedo
- 1791–1798 Jacobo de Ugarte y Loyola
- 1800–1804 José Fernando de Abascal y Sousa
- 1804–1805 José Ignacio Ortiz de Salinas
- 1805–1811 Roque Abarca
- 1811–1821 José de la Cruz

=== Province of Zacatecas ===
- Under the jurisdiction of the Audiencia of Guadalajara.
- 1787 Intendencia of Zacatecas, part of New Spain.
- 1821 Part of independent Mexico.
- 1824 Province transformed into State of Zacatecas.

==== Intendants of Zacatecas ====
- 1789–1792 Felipe Cleere
- 1792–1796 José de Peón y Valdés
- 1796–1810 Francisco Rendón
- 1810–1811 Miguel de Rivera, conde de Santiago de la Laguna
- 1811 José Manuel de Ochoa
- 1811 Juan José Zambrano
- 1811–1812 Martín de Mednina
- 1812–1814 Santiago de Irisarri
- 1814–1816 Diego García Conde
- 1816–1820 José de Gayangos
- 1821–1823 Manuel Orive y Novales

=== Province of Nuevo Santander ===
- Under the jurisdiction of the Audiencia of Guadalajara.
- 1746 Spanish settlement begins.
- 1748 Province of Nuevo Santander created.
- 1777–1793 Part of Provincias Internas.
- 1812–1822 Part of Provincias Internas.
- 1822 Part of independent Mexico as Tamaulipas.

==== Governors of Nuevo Santander ====
- 31 May 1748 – 8 April 1767 José de Escandón y Helguera
- 8 April 1767 – 20 January 1768 Juan Fernando de Palacio
- 20 January 1768 – 18 September 1769 José Rubio
- 18 September 1769 – 12 August 1777 Vicente González Santianés
- August 1777 – 19 February 1779 Francisco de Echegaray
- 19 February 1779 – 17 April 1779 Vacant
- 17 April 1779 – 21 November 1779 Manuel Medina
- 21 November 1779 – 17 February 1780 Vacant
- 17 February 1780 – 17 March 1781 Manuel Ignacio de Escandón (First time)
- 17 March 1781 – 20 February 1786 Diego Lazaga
- 20 February 1786 – 23 December 1788 Juan Miguel Zozaya (First time)
- 23 December 1788 – 18 June 1789 Melchor Vidal de Lorca
- 20 June 1789 – 10 September 1789 Juan Miguel Zozaya (Second time)
- 10 September 1789 – 10 July 1790 Manuel Muñoz
- 10 July 1790 – 21 May 1800 Manuel Ignacio de Escandón (Second time)
- 21 May 1800 – January 1802 José Blanco
- January 1802 – 18 April 1804 Francisco de Ixart
- 18 April 1804 – 18 September 1804 Pedro de Alba
- 18 September 1804 – 15 April 1811 Manuel de Iturbe y Iraeta
- 15 April 1811 – 1 May 1819 Joaquín de Arredondo
- September 1819 – September 1819 Juan Fermín de Janicotena (acting)
- 1 May 1819 – 7 July 1821 José María Echeagaray
- 7 July 1821 – 22 September 1822 Felipe de la Garza Cisneros

=== New Kingdom of León (Nuevo León) ===
- Under the jurisdiction of Audiencia of Guadalajara.
- 1582 Nuevo Reino de León established.
- 1777–1793 Part of the Provincias Internas.
- 1821 Part of independent Mexico.
- 1824 Kingdom transformed into State of Nuevo León.

==== Governors of Nuevo León ====
- 1698–1703 Juan Francisco de Vergara y Mendoza
- 1703–1705 Francisco Báez Treviño (First time) (interim)
- 1705–1707 Gregorio de Salinas Verona
- 1707–1708 Cipriano García de Pruneda
- 1708–1710 Luis García de Pruneda (interim)
- 1710–1714 Francisco Mier y Torre
- 1714–1718 Francisco Báez Treviño (Second time) (interim)
- 1718–1719 Juan Ignacio Flores Mogollón
- 1719–1723 Francisco de Bardadillo y Vittoria
- 1723–1725 Juan José de Arriaga y Brambila
- 1725–1730 Pedro de Saravia Cortés
- 1730–1731 Bernardino de Meneses Monroy y Mendonza Bracamonte, conde de Peñalba
- 1731–1740 José Antonio Fernández de Jáuregui y Urrita
- 1740–1746 Pedro del Barrio Junco y Espriella (First time)
- 1746–1752 Vicente Bueno de la Borbolla
- 1752–1757 Pedro del Barrio Junco y Espriella (Second time)
- 1757–1759 Domingo Miguel Guajardo (interim)
- 1759–1762 Juan Manuel Muñoz de Villavicencio
- 1762–1764 Carlos de Velasco
- 1764–1772 Ignacio Ussel y Guimbarda
- 1772–1773 Francisco de Echegaray
- 1773–1781 Melchor Vidal de Lorca y Villena
- 1781–1785 Vicente González de Santianes
- 1785–1795 Joaquín de Mier y Noriega
- 1795–1805 Simón de Herrera y Leyva
- 1805–1810 Pedro de Herrera y Leyva
- 1810–1811 Manuel de Santa Maria
- 1813 Ramón Díaz Bustamante
- 1812–1817 The Alcaldes of Monterrey
- 1817–1818 Bernardo Villareal
- 1818–1821 Francisco Bruno Barrea

== Commandancy General of the Provincias Internas ==
- All Provincias Internas were under the jurisdiction of the Audiencia of Guadalajara with oversight by the Viceroy before the creation of the Commandancy General.
- 1777 Commandancy General of the Provincias Internas created with autonomy from the Viceroy.
- 1788–1793 Divided into Eastern Provinces (Coahuila, Texas, Nuevo León, Nuevo Santander) and Western Provinces (Sonora, Nueva Vizcaya, Nuevo México, Las Californias).
- 1793 Nuevo León and Nuevo Santander removed from the Provincias Internas.
- 1812 Nuevo Santander part of the Provincias Internas.
- 1813–1821 Re-divided into Eastern and Western Commandancies General.

=== Commandants General ===
- 1777–1783 Teodoro Francisco de Croix, conde de Croix
- 1783–1784 Felipe de Neve
- 1784–1786 José Antonio Rengel de Alcaraz y Páez
- 1786–1788 Jacobo Ugarte y Loyola
- 1792 interim Josef de la Barcena y Manzano
- 1793–1802 Pedro de Nava
- 1802–1813 Nemesio Salcedo y Salcedo

== Eastern Provinces (Oriente) ==
=== Commandants General of the Eastern Provinces ===
- 1788–1791 Juan de Uglade
- 1791–1793 Ramón de Castro y Gutierrez
- 1813 Simón Herrera y Leyva
- 1813–1817 Joaquín de Arredondo y Mioño Pelegrin y Bustamante

=== Province of Nueva Extremadura ===
- Under the jurisdiction of the Audiencia of Guadalajara.
- 1575 Part of Nueva Vizcaya.
- 23 January 1691 Province of Coahuila and Texas.
- 1716 Coahuila a separate province.
- 1777–1822 Part of the Provincias Internas.
- 1822 Part of independent Mexico.
- 1824 Province transformed into State of Coahuila y Texas.

==== Governors of Nueva Extremadura ====
- 1698–1703 Francisco Cuervo y Valdés
- 1703–1705 Matías de Aguirre
- 1705–1708 Martín de Alarcón
- 1708–1714 Simón de Padilla y Córdova
- 1714 Pedro Fermín de Echever y Subiza
- 1714–1716 Juan de Valdes
- 1716–1717 José Antonio de Eca y Múzquiz
- 1717–1719 Martín de Alarcón
- 1719–1722 José Azlo y Virto de Vera, marqués de San Miguel de Aguayo
- 1722–1729 Blas de la Garza Falcón (First time)
- 1729–1733 Manuel de Sandoval
- 1733–1735 Blas de la Garza Falcón (Second time)
- 1735–1739 Clemente de la Garza Falcón
- 1739–1744 Juan García Pruneda
- 1744–1754 Pedro de Rábago y Terán
- 1754–1756 Manuel Antonio Bustillos y Ceballos
- 1756–1757 Miguel de Sesman y Escudero
- 1757–1759 Ángel Martos y Navarrette
- 1759–1762 Jacinto de Barríos y Jáguregui (First time)
- 1762–1764 Lorenzo Cancio Sierra y Cienfuegos
- 1764–1765 Diego Ortiz Parrilla
- 1765–1768 Jacinto de Barríos y Jáguregui (Second time)
- 1768–1769 José Costilla y Terán
- 1769–1777 Jacobo de Ugarte y Loyola
- 1777–1783 Juan de Ugalde
- 1783–1788 Pedro Fueros
- 1788–1790 Juan Gutiérrez de la Cueva (First time)
- 1790–1795 Miguel Jose de Emparán
- 1795–1797 Juan Gutiérrez de la Cueva (Second time)
- 1797–1805 Antonio Cordero y Bustamante (First time)
- 1805–1809 José Joaquín de Ugarte
- 1809–1817 Antonio Cordero y Bustamante (Second time)
- 1817–1818 Antonio García de Tejada
- 1818–1819 José Franco
- 1819–1820 Manuel Pardo
- 1820–1822 Antonio Elosúa

=== Province of Texas (1698–1822) - also called Province of New Philippines ===
- 1682 Ruled as part of Coahuila; under the jurisdiction of the Audiencia of Guadalajara.
- February 1685 – January 1689 French establish Fort Saint Louis at Matagorda Bay.
- 1691 Province of Coahuila y Texas created.
- c.1726 Coahuila and Texas separated.
- 1822 Province of Mexico.
- 14 October 1824 Transformed into State of Coahuila y Texas.
- 15 November 1835 Texas ruled by Provisional Government.
- 2 March 1836 Independent Republic of Texas established.

=== Province of Nuevo México (1598–1822) ===
- 1595 Santa Fe de Nuevo México conquered and established.
- 1822 Part of independent Mexico.
- 14 October 1824 Territory of Santa Fe de Nuevo México created.

== Western Provinces (Poniente) ==
=== Commandants General of the Western Provinces ===
- 1788–1790 Jacobo Ugarte y Loyola
- 1790–1793 Pedro de Nava
- 1813–1817 Bernardo Bonavia y Zapata
- 1817–1821 Alejo García Conde

=== Province of New Navarre ===
- Under the jurisdiction of the Audiencia of Guadalajara
- 1732 Province of New Navarre (formerly part of Nueva Vizcaya) created.
- 1777–1821 Part of the Provincias Internas.
- 1787 Intendencia of Sonora created.
- 1821 Part of independent Mexico.
- 1824 Sonora y Sinaloa transformed into a State.

==== Governors of New Navarre ====
- 1734–1741 Manuel Bernal de Huidobro
- 1741–1748 Augustín de Vildósola
- 1748–1749 José Rafael Rodriguez Gallardo
- 1749–1753 Diego Ortiz Parilla
- 1753–1755 Pablo de Arce y Arroyo
- 1755–1760 Juan Antonio de Mendoza
- 1760–1762 José Tiendra de Cuervo
- 1763–1770 Juan Claudio de Pineda
- 1770–1772 Pedro de Corbalán (First time)
- 1772–1773 Mateo Sastré
- 1773–1777 Francisco Antonio Crespo
- 1777–1787 Pedro de Corbalán (Second time)

==== Governor-Intendants of New Navarre ====
- 1787–1789 Pedro Garrido y Durán
- 1789–1790 Augustín de la Cuenta y Zayas
- 1790–1793 Enrique Gimarest
- 1793–1796 Alonso Tresierra y Cano
- 1796–1813 Alejo García Conde
- 1813–1817 Manuel Antonio Cordero y Bustamante (First time)
- 1818 Ignacio de Bustamante (First time)
- 1818 Manuel Fernández Rojo
- 1818–1819 Ignacio de Bustamante (Second time)
- 1819 Juan José Lombrán
- 1819–1821 Manuel Antonio Cordero y Bustamante (Second time)

=== Province of Nueva Vizcaya ===
- Under the jurisdiction of the Audiencia of Guadalajara.
- 1562 Province of Nueva Vizcaya established.
- 1777–1821 Part of the Commandancy General of the Provincias Internas.
- 1786 Intendencia of Durango established.
- 1821 Province part of independent Mexico
- 1824 Nueva Vizcaya transformed into the states of Durango and Chihuahua.

==== Governors of Nueva Vizcaya ====
- 1562–1575 Francisco de Ibarra
- 1575–1576 Miguel Lopez de Ibarra
- 1576–1589 Diego de Ibarray Perez de Marqueagui
- 1589–1603 Rodrigo Rio de Losa y Rodriguez Gordujuela
- 1595–1598 Diego Fernández de Velasco (governor)
- 1603–1612 Francisco de Urdiňola
- 1612–1624 Gaspar de Alvear
- 1624-1629 Mateo de Vega
- 1629–1631 Hipolito de Velasco
- 1631–1633 Luis de Velasco
- 1633–1638 Luis Monsalve y Saavedra
- 1638–1640 Francisco Bravo de la Serna
- 1640–1640 Luis de Valdes y Rejano
- 1640–1642 Fernando Suoza de Suarea
- 1642–1648 Luis de Valdes
- 1648–1654 Diego Guajardo Fajardo
- 1654–1660 Enrique Davila y Pacheco
- 1660–1666 Francisco Gorraez y Beaumont
- 1666–1671 Antonio Oca y Sarmiento
- 1671–1673 Jose Garcia Salcedo
- 1674–1676 Martin Rebollar y Cuevas
- 1676–1680 Lope de Sierra y Osorio
- 1680–1683 Bartolome Estrada de Valdez y Ramirez Jove
- 1683-1687 Gabriel de Neira y Quiroga
- 1687-1697 San Miguel de Aguayo
- 1688–1693 Juan Isidro de Pardiňas Villar de Francos
- 1693–1698 Gabriel del Castillo
- 1698–1703 Juan Bautista de Larrea Palomino y Solís
- 1703–1708 Juan Fernández de Córdoba
- 1708–1714 Antonio de Deza y Ulloa
- 1714–1720 Juan Manuel de San Juan y Santa Cruz
- 1720–1723 Martín de Alday
- 1723–1727 José Sebastián López de Carvajal
- 1728–1733 Ignacio Francisco de Barrutia y Aeta Esenagucia
- 1733–1738 Juan José Vértiz y Ontañón
- 1738–1743 Juan Bautista de Belaunzarán y Zumeta
- 1743–1748 José Enrique de Cosío, marqués de Torre Campo
- 1748–1753 Jaun Francico de la Puerta y de la Barrera
- 1753–1761 Mateo Antonio de Mendoza Díaz de Arce
- 1761–1769 José Carlos de Agüero y González de Agüero
- 1769–1776 José de Fayni y Gálvez
- 1776–1784 Felipe de Barri
- 1784–1785 Juan Velázquez
- 1785–1785 Manuel Muñoz
- 1785–1786 Manuel Flon y Tejada, conde de la Cadena

==== Governor-Intendants of Reino de la Nueva Vizcaya (Durango) ====
- 1786–1791 Felipe Díaz de Ortega Bustillo
- 1791–1793 Francisco Antonio de Potau y de Colón de Portugal
- 1793–1796 Francisco José de Urrutia Montoya
- 1796–1813 Bernardo Bonavia y Zapata
- 1813–1817 Alejo Garcia Conde
- 1817–1818 Angel Pinilla y Pérez
- 1818–1819 Antonio Cordero y Bustamante
- 1819–1821 Diego García Conde

=== Province of Las Californias ===
- 28 September 1542 – First European landing by Juan Rodríguez Cabrillo.
- 4 November 1595 – Sebastián Rodríguez Cermeño claims the coast for Spain.
- 1697 – First Mission erected in Baja California.
- 1768 – Spanish settlement begins.
- 1769 – First Mission and Presidio erected in 'upper' California.
- 3 June 1770 – Province of Las Californias established.
- 1804 – Provinces of Alta California and Baja California created.
- 11 April 1822 – Both provinces part of independent Mexican Empire as the Territories of Baja and Alta California.

==== Governors of Las Californias ====
- 1768 – 9 July 1770 Gaspar de Portolá (1716–1786)
- March 1770 – 4 March 1775 Felipe de Barri (?-1784 – civil Governor in Loreto)
- 9 July 1770 – 23 March 1774 Pedro Fages (1730–1796?)
- 23 March 1774 – 3 February 1777 Fernando José Rivera y Moncada (1725–1781)
- 3 February 1777 – 7 September 1782 Felipe de Neve (1728–1784)
- 7 September 1782 – 17 April 1791 Pedro Fages (s.a.)
- 17 April 1791 – 9 April 1792 José Antonio de Roméu, conde de Rivera Gigado (1842–1792)
- 9 April 1792 – November 1794 José Joaquín de Arrillaga (First time) (1750–1814) (acting)
- November 1794 – 16 January 1800 Diego de Borica (1742–1800)
- 16 January 1800 – 11 March 1802 Pedro de Alberni (acting) (1747–1802)
- 11 March 1802 – 1804 José Joaquín de Arrillaga (Second time) (s.a.)
- See List of pre-statehood governors of California for Governors of Alta California (Spanish: 1804–1822, Mexican: 1822–1847)

== Provinces of the Kingdom of Guatemala ==
- Under the judicial jurisdiction of the Real Audiencia of Guatemala and the administrative supervision of its President-Captain General with great autonomy from the Viceroy of New Spain.

=== Province of Guatemala ===
- Directly administered by the President-Captain General of the Real Audiencia of Guatemala.

=== Province of Chiapas ===
- 1529 Province of Chiapas established.
- 1576 Alcaldía Mayor of Ciudad Real de Chiapa
- 1769 Divided into Alcaldía Mayor of Ciudad Real and Alcaldía Mayor of Tuxtla
- 20 September 1786 Intendencia of Ciudad Real de Chiapas created.
- 1821 Part of independent Mexico.
- 1824 Province transformed into State of Chiapas, with the exception of Soconusco.

==== Lieutenant Governors of Chiapas ====
- 1528–1529 Diego de Mazariegos
- 1529–1531 Juan Enríquez de Guzmán
- 1531 Diego de Olguín
- 1532–1535 Francisco Ortés de Velasco (First time)
- 1535–1537 García de Padilla
- 1537–1540 Baltazar Guerra de la Vega
- 1540 Gonzalo de Ovalle (First time)
- 1540 García de Mendano (First time)
- 1540–1542 Francisco de Montejo
- 1542–1544 García de Mendano (Second time)
- 1544 Antonio de Saz y de la Torre
- 1545 Luis de Torres Medinilla
- 1545 Francisco Ortés de Velasco (Second time)
- 1545 Gonzalo de Ovalle (Second time)
- 1545–1553 The Alcaldes of Ciudad Real de Chiapa
- 1553–1556 Antonio Alfonso Mazariegos
- 1556–1570 Francisco Ortés de Velasco (Third time)
- 1570 Francisco del Valle Marroquín
- 1570–1576 Juan de Meza

==== Alcaldes Mayores of Ciudad Real de Chiapa ====
- 1577–1581 Juan de Meza
- 1582–1586 Gaspar de Padilla
- 1586–1593 Pedro Martínez (First time)
- 1593 Martín Núñez
- 1594–1595 Pedro Martínez (Second time)
- 1596–1598 Alonso Bernaldez de Quiroz
- 1599 Baltazar Muriel de Valdivieso (First time)
- 1600 Bernardo Quiroz y Aguilera
- 1601–1610 Baltazar Muriel de Valdivieso (Second time)
- 1610–1616 Gabriel de Loarte y Ovalle
- 1617 Pedro Urbina de Cervera
- 1617–1620 Agustín García de Albornoz Legaspi
- 1620 Gabriel de Orellana
- 1621–1627 Gabriel de Ugarte y Ayala
- 1627 Baltazar Caso
- 1628–1633 Juan Ruiz de Contreras (First time)
- 1633 José Sánchez Serrano
- 1634 Juan Ruiz de Contreras (Second time)
- 1634–1638 Francisco de Ávila y Lugo (First time)
- 1638 Diego Carrillo
- 1639 Francisco de Ávila y Lugo (Second time)
- 1639–1646 Diego de Vera Ordóñez de Villa Quirán
- 1646–1650 Melchor Sardo de Céspedes
- 1650 Pedro Lara de Mongrovejo (First time)
- 1650–1656 Alonso Vargas Zapata y Luján
- 1656–1660 Baltazar Caso Ponce de León (First time)
- 1660 Pedro López Ramales
- 1661 Baltazar Caso Ponce de León (Second time)
- 1662–1666 Fernando Álvarez de Aguiar
- 1666 Pedro de Zavaleta
- 1667 Pedro Lara de Mongrovejo (Second time)
- 1667–1670 Agustín Sáenz Vázquez
- 1670 Andrés de Ochoa Zárate
- 1671–1682 Juan Bautista González del Álamo
- 1682 José de Oruéta
- 1683–1685 Martínez de Urdaniz
- 1685–1693 Manuel de Mayesterra y Atocha
- 1693–1695 Francisco Vadillo (First time)
- 1695 Melchor de Mencos
- 1696–1697 Francisco Vadillo (Second time)
- 1698 Francisco Astudillo Sardo
- 1698–1708 Martín González de Vergara y Pardo
- 1708 Gaspar de Sierra
- 1709 Manuel de Bustamante (First time)
- 1709 Francisco Ballesteros
- 1710–1712 Pedro Gutiérrez de Mier y Terán
- 1712 Fernando del Monge (First time)
- 1712–1714 Melchor Sardo de Céspedes
- 1714–1719 Manuel de Bustamante (Second time)
- 1720 Carlos Vélez y Arriaga
- 1720 José Damián Fernández de Córdoba
- 1721–1724 José Damián Cruz de Córdob
- 1725–1728 Martín José de Bustamante
- 1728–1730 Antonio Varela y Moreno
- 1730 Gabriel Francisco Laguna
- 1731 Fernando del Monge (Second time)
- 1732–1737 Pedro José Caballero
- 1734 Antonio de la Unquera y Cevallos
- 1735–1736 Gabriel Francisco Laguna
- 1737 Miguel Fernández Romero
- 1737 Baltazar González de Vega
- 1738–1743 Antonio Zuazua y Mújica
- 1744–1746 Juan Bautista Garracín
- 1746–1751 Francisco Ángel de Elías
- 1752 Juan José Bocanegra
- 1753–1754 José Ángel Toledo
- 1755–1758 Manuel Ortiz
- 1758 Miguel Ignacio Viurrum
- 1759–1760 Antonio de Obeso
- 1761–1765 Joaquín Fernández Prieto Isla y Bustamante
- 1765–1767 Tomás de Murga
- 1767–1768 Fernando Gómez de Andrade

==== Alcaldes Mayores of Ciudad Real ====
- 1770–1772 Esteban Gutiérrez de la Torre
- 1772–1785 Cristóbal Ortiz de Avilés
- 1785 Ignacio Coronado
- 1786 Antonio Gutiérrez de Arce
- 1786 Alonso de Vargas

==== Alcaldes Mayores of Tuxtla ====
- 1769–1777 Juan de Oliver
- 1778–1783 Luis de Engrava y Ovalle
- 1783–1786 Miguel del Pino y Martínez

==== Governor-Intendants of Chiapas ====
- 1786–1789 Francisco Saavedra Carbajal
- 1789–1794 Agustín de las Cuentas y Zayas
- 1794 Francisco Durán
- 1794 Luis Martínez
- 1795 Tomás Mollinedo
- 1796–1802 Antonio Norberto Serrano Polo
- 1802–1807 Manuel de Olazábal
- 1807 Mariano Valero
- 1807–1809 Tomás de Mollinedo y Villavicencio
- 1809 Manuel Junquito y Baquerizo (First time)
- 1810 Manuel Ramírez
- 1811–1814 Manuel Junquito y Baquerizo (Second time)
- 1814 Juan Nepomuceno Batres
- 1814 Antonio Gutiérrez de Arce
- 1815 Gregorio Suasnávar
- 1816 Juan Antonio López
- 1817–1818 Juan María de Ancheita
- 1819 Carlos Castañón
- 1819–1821 Juan Nepomuceno Batres

=== Province of Nicaragua ===
- 1502 Coast of Nicaragua discovered by Christopher Columbus.
- 1522 First settlements established.
- 1522–1538 Subordinated to Audiencia of Santo Domingo; ruled by governors.
- 1524 León founded.
- 1538–1544 Subordinated to the Real Audiencia of Panama.
- 1544 Part of the Kingdom of Guatemala.
- 1552 Governorship demoted to Alcaldía Mayor.
- 1566 Governorship reestablished.
- 1661 – 12 September 1861 British Protectorate over the tribal Mosquito Coast.
- 21 August 1685 – 14 September 1685 León captured by pirates under William Dampier.
- 23 December 1786 Intendencia of León (including Costa Rica) created.
- 15 September 1821 Declaration of independence from Spain of the Kingdom of Guatemala as part of Mexican Independence (Acta de Nublados).
- 28 September 1821 León, while awaiting developments with regard to Spain, proclaims its secession from the Kingdom of Guatemala.
- 4 October 1821 Granada reaffirms its being part of the Kingdom of Guatemala.
- 12 October 1821 Part of First Mexican Empire.
- 17 April 1823 León declares itself an "orphan" and thus sovereign.
- 1 July 1823 The Federal Republic of Central America proclaims independence from Mexico and invites those provinces that had left the Kingdom of Guatemala to join.
- 2 July 1823 León accedes to invitation; incorporation into Central America.
- 4 January 1825 León surrenders to the authority of Manuel Arzú, commissioned by the federal government.
- 30 April 1838 Separation from the Federation sanctioned; promulgated 2 May 1838.
- 28 February 1854 Republic of Nicaragua reestablished.

==== Governors of Nicaragua ====
- 1522–1524 Gil González Dávila
- 1524–1526 Francisco Hernández de Córdoba
- 1526–1531 Pedro Arias de Ávila
- 1531–1535 Francisco de Castañeda
- 1536–1544 Rodrigo de Contreras
- 1544 Diego de Herrera
- 1544–1552 Administered directly by the Audiencia of Guatemala.

==== Alcaldes Mayores of Nicaragua ====
- 1552–1553 Alonso Ortiz de Elgueta
- 1553 Nicolás López de Urraga (First time)
- 1553–1555 Juan de Cavallón
- 1555 Juan Márquez
- 1555–1556 Álvaro de Paz
- 1556–1557 Nicolás López de Urraga (Second time)
- 1558 Andrés López Moraga
- 1558–1560 Francisco de Mendoza
- 1561–1564 Juan Vásquez de Coronado
- 1564–1566 Hernando Bermejo

==== Governors of Nicaragua ====
- 1566–1575 Alonso de Casaos
- 1575–1576 Francisco del Valle Marroquín
- 1576–1583 Diego de Artieda y Chirino
- 1583–1589 Hernando de Gasco
- 1589–1592 Carlos de Arellano
- 1592–1599 Bartolomé de Lences
- 1599–1603 Bernardino de Obando
- 1603–1622 Alonso Lara de Córdoba
- 1622 Cristóbal de Villagrán
- 1622–1623 Alonso Lazo
- 1623–1625 Santiago de Figueroa
- 1625–1627 Lázaro de Albizúa
- 1627–1630 Juan de Agüero
- 1630–1634 Francisco de Asagra y Vargas
- 1634–1641 Pedro de Velasco
- 1641–1660 Juan de Bracamonte
- 1660–1665 Diego de Castro
- 1665–1669 Juan Salinas y Cerda
- 1669–1673 Antonio Temiño Dávila
- 1673–1681 Pablo de Loyola
- 1681 Antonio Coello
- 1681–1689 Pedro Álvarez Castrillón
- 1689–1693 Gabriel Rodríguez Bravo de Hoyos
- 1693–1699 Pedro Gerónimo Luis de Comenares y Camargo
- 1699 – 22 October 1705 Miguel de Camargo
- 22 October 1705 – 21 August 1721 Sebastián de Arancibia y Sasi
- 1722–1724 Antonio Póveda y Rivadineira (First time) (died 1727)
- 1724–1727 Tomás Marcos, duque de Estrada (First time)
- 26 January 1727 – 7 July 1727 Antonio Póveda y Rivadineira (Second time) (s.a.)
- 26 August 1727 – 1728 Pedro Martínez de Uparrio
- August 1728 – 1730 Tomás Marcos, duque de Estrada (Second time)
- 1730–1736 Bartolomé González Fitoria
- 1736–1740 Antonio Ortiz
- 21 November 1740 – 1745 José Antonio Lacayo de Briones
- 1745 Francisco Antonio de Cáceres Molinedo
- 23 August 1745 – December 1746 Juan de Vera
- December 1746 – 1753 Alonso Fernández de Heredia
- 1753–1756 José González Rancaño
- 1756–1759 Melchor Vidal de Lorca y Villena (First time)
- 1759–1765 Pantaleón Ibáñez Cuevas
- 1765–1766 Melchor Vidal de Lorca y Villena (Second time)
- 1766–1776 Domingo Cabello y Robles
- 1777–1782 Manuel de Quiroga
- 1779–1783 José de Estachería
- 1783 – 23 December 1786 Juan de Ayza y Blancazo Allue y Palacín

==== Governors-Intendants of León (Nicaragua) ====
- 23 December 1786 – 1789 Juan de Ayza y Blancazo Allue y Palacín
- 1789–1793 José Mateu y Aranda
- 1793 – 13 December 1811 José de Salvador
- 13 December 1811 – 1814 Nicolás García Jerez (14 December 1814 – 1817 also President of the Governing Junta)
- 1814–1816 Juan Bautista Gual
- 1816–1818 Manuel de Beltranena
- 1818–April 1823 Miguel González Saravia

==== Superior Political Chief and Intendant of León ====
- Office of Superior Political Chief (Jefe Político Superior) created by Spanish Constitution of 1812.
- 15 September 1821 – 12 October 1821 Miguel González de Saravia y Colarte, President of the Provisional Governing Junta
- 17 April 1823 – 4 January 1825 Provisional Governing Junta, members:

Pedro Solís Terán (Primer Vocal)
José del Carmen Salazar Lacayo
Francisco Quiñónez
Domingo Nicolás Galarza y Briceño de Coca
Basilio Carrillo
José Valentín Fernández Gallegos (alternate)
Juan Modesto Hernández (alternate)

=== Province of Costa Rica ===
- 1502 Claimed for Spain.
- 1540 Province of Nuevo Cartago y Costa Rica created, part of the Kingdom of Guatemala.
- 1565 Province of Costa Rica created.
- 23 December 1786 Gobierno ('government') of Costa Rica established within Intendencia of León (see Nicaragua).
- 12 November 1821 Independence (Province of Costa Rica)
- 4 March 1824 – 15 November 1838 Constituent state of the Federal Republic of Central America.
- 8 September 1824 Free State of Costa Rica.
- 7 March 1847 State of Costa Rica.
- 31 August 1848 Republic of Costa Rica.

==== Governors of Costa Rica ====
- 1568–1573 Parafán de Ribera
- 1574–1577 Alonso de Anguciana y Gamboa
- 1577–1590 Diego de Artieda y Chirino
- 1590–1591 Juan Valásquez Ramiro
- 1591–1592 Bartolomé de Lences
- 1592–1595 Gonzalo de lam Palma
- 1595–1599 Fernando de la Cueva
- 1600–1604 Gonzalo Vázquez de Coronado y Arias Dávila
- 1604–1613 Juan de Ocón y Trillo
- 1613–1619 Juan de Mendoza y Medrano
- 1619–1624 Alonso del Castillo y Guzmán
- 1624–1630 Juan de Echáuz
- 1630–1634 Juan de Villalta
- 1634–1636 Juan de Agüero
- 1636–1644 Gregorio de Sandoval y González de Alcalá
- 1644–1650 Juan de Cháves y Mendoza
- 1650–1655 Juan Fernández de Salinas y de la Cerda
- 1655–1661 Andrés Arias Maldonaldo y Mendoza
- 1662–1664 Rodrigo Arias Maldonaldo
- 1664–1665 Juan de Obregón
- 1664–1674 Juan López de la Flor
- 1675–1681 Juan Francisco Sáenz Vázquez y Sendín
- 1681–1693 Miguel Gómez de Lara
- 1693–1698 Manuel de Bustamante y Vivero
- 1698–1704 Francisco Serrano de Reina y Lizarde
- 1704–1707 Diego de Herrera y Campuzano
- 1707–1712 Lorenzo Antonio de Granada y Balbín
- 1713–1717 José Antonio Lacayo de Briones y Palacios
- 1717–1718 Pedro Ruíz de Bustamante
- 1718–1726 Diego de la Haya y Fernández
- 1727–1736 Baltasar Francisco de Valderrama y Haro
- 1736 Antonio Vázquez de la Quadra
- 1736–1739 Francisco Antonio de Carrandi y Menán
- 1739–1740 Francisco de Olaechea
- 2 June 1740 – 5 November 1747 Juan Gemmir y Lleonart (died 1747)
- 22 November 1747 – 14 March 1750 Luis Díez Navarro (interim to 22 January 1748)
- 1750–1754 Cristóbal Ignacio de Soría
- 1754 – 2 July 1756 Francisco Fernández de la Pástora (died 1756)
- 12 August 1756 – 24 October 1757 José Antonio de Oreamuno y Vázquez Melendez (First time) (interim)
- 24 October 1757 – 18 September 1758 José Gonzalez Rancaño (interim)
- 18 September 1758 – 1761 Manuel Soler (died 1763) (abandoned office 1760)
- 1761 Francisco Javier de Oreamuno y Vázquez Melendez (interim)
- 1761 Pedro Manuel de Ayerdi (interim)
- 1761–1764 José Antonio de Oreamuno y Vázquez Melendez (Second time) (interim)
- 1764–1773 José Joaquín de Nava y Cabezudo (acting to 3 April 1764)
- 1773–1778 Juan Fernández de Bobadilla (First time) (died 1781)
- 25 June 1778 – 23 July 1780 José Perié y Barros (First time) (died 1789)
- 23 July 1780 – 28 January 1781 Juan Fernández de Bobadilla (Second time) (interim)
- 28 January 1781 – 1781 Francisco Carzo (interim)
- 11 April 1781 – 1785 Juan Flores (interim)
- 31 January 1785 – 7 January 1789 José Perié y Barros (Second time) (s.a.)
- 7 January 1789 – 1789 José Antonio de Oriamuno (acting)
- 1789–1790 Juan Esteban Martínez de Pinillos (interim)
- 7 November 1790 – 1797 José Vázquez y Téllez
- 3 April 1797 – 4 December 1810 Tomás de Acosta y Hurtado de Mendoza (died 1821)
- 4 December 1810 – 10 June 1819 Juan de Dios de Ayala y Gudiño (died 1819) (military governor from 3 July 1810)
- 10 June 1819 – 11 October 1821 Juan Manuel de Cañas y Trujillo (interim)

== Provinces under the Real Audiencia of Manila ==
- Spanish East Indies were under the judicial jurisdiction of the Real Audiencia of Manila and the administrative supervision of the Governor General-Captain General with great autonomy from the Viceroy of New Spain.
- See Governor-General of the Philippines for list.

== Sources and references ==
- WorldStatesmen – see each present country
- Marquez Terrazas, Zacarias. Memorias del Papigochic. Liberia Kosmos. 2005

== See also ==
- List of viceroys of New Spain
- Viceroyalty of New Spain
