= Provincias Internas =

Administrative district of the Spanish Empire

Captaincy General of the Inner Provinces Capitanía General de las Provincias Internas
- 1776–1821
- Left: Cross of Burgundy; Right: Early modern flag
- Motto: Plus Ultra transl. Further Beyond
- Anthem: Marcha Real "Royal March" (1776–1821)
- New Spain in 1819 with the boundaries established at the Adams–Onís Treaty. Provincias Internas Kingdom of Nueva Galicia Kingdom of Mexico Captaincy General of Yucatán Captaincy General of Guatemala
- Status: Captaincy General of Spain
- Capital: Arizpe 1776–1787, Durango 1787–1821 (Western division); Monterrey 1787–1821 (Eastern division)
- Religion: Roman Catholicism
- Government: Monarchy
- King
  - 1776–1788: Charles III
  - 1813–1821: Ferdinand VII
- Captain General
  - 1776–1783: Teodoro de Croix
- Historical era: Spanish Empire
  - Administrative reorganisation: 1776
  - Treaty of Córdoba: 1821
Succeeded by
First Mexican Empire
- Today part of: Mexico; United States

The Provincias Internas (Spanish: Inner Provinces), also known as the Comandancia y Capitanía General de las Provincias Internas (Commandancy and General Captaincy of the Inner Provinces), was an administrative district of the Spanish Empire envisioned in 1768 as including Sinaloa, Sonora, Nueva Vizcaya (today's Chihuahua and Durango) and Baja and Alta California, with its capital in Arizpe (Sonora). The jurisdiction was formally created in 1776, on the official grounds that it would provide more autonomy for the frontier provinces, present-day northern Mexico and the Southwestern United States—and perhaps with the unofficial goal of reducing the political and economic power of the viceroy running New Spain from Mexico City by creating a command for the northern regions. If the goal of its creation was to establish a unified government in political, military and fiscal affairs for northern New Spain, this unity was elusive. The Commandancy General experienced significant changes in its administration because of experimentation to find the best government for the frontier region as well as bureaucratic in-fighting between Mexico City elites and Bourbon reformers in Madrid. Its creation was part of the Bourbon Reforms and was part of an effort to invigorate economic and population growth in the region to stave off encroachment on the region by foreign powers. During its existence, the Commandancy General encompassed the provinces of New Navarre, New Biscay, The Californias, New Mexico, New Santander, New Kingdom of Leon, Coahuila (formerly New Extremadura) and Texas.

== History ==
=== Establishment ===
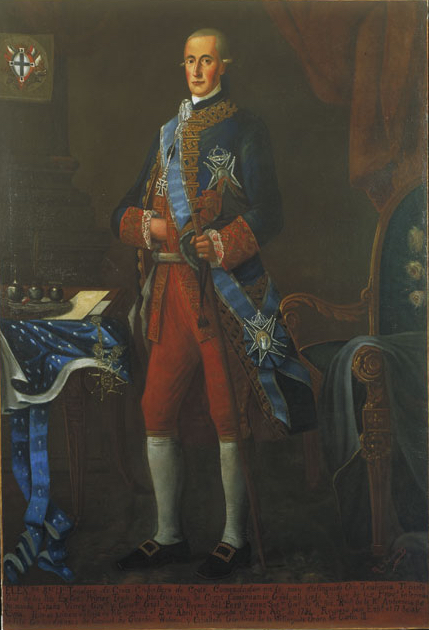
Teodoro de Croix, first Captain General of the Provincias Internas.

The Provincias Internas were the brainchild of José de Gálvez. He hit upon the initial 1768 idea during his time as royal Visitador General (Inspector General) to New Spain from 1765 to 1771, possibly after speaking to merchants of Alamos at the Jalapa fair on his way from Veracruz to Mexico City. His initial idea was to create a full-fledged viceroyalty or captaincy general out of the northern provinces, but the low population of the area and large military expenses of the area in comparison to its revenues, prevented this. Instead the chief official of the area received the military title of commander or commandant general (Spanish: comandante general) in addition to being the chief civil executive officer of the region. Due to objections from the viceroys of New Spain, Gálvez was unable to implement his plan during his time as visitador, but a few years after his return he was appointed Minister of the Indies. This was essentially a new office created by King Charles III which made Gálvez, for all purposes, independent of the Council of the Indies (of which he was also an honorary member). From his new position, Gálvez was able to implement his vision for Spanish America. In addition to the Provincias Internas, Gálvez also created the Viceroyalty of the Río de la Plata and the Captaincy General of Venezuela (which was essentially a new viceroyalty in all but name). He also recommenced the stalled project of replacing the older corregimientos and alcaldías mayores with intendants. Gálvez appointed Teodoro de Croix as the first Commander General of the Provinicas Internas.

It is assumed that my actual title delivers in your favor that you have given the jurisdiction and extensive powers that you need as governor and captain General of the mentioned provinces and all its borders, I declare, by this Code and Royal Decree, that in your higher command are to be understood and adjoined the Subaltern governments of Coahuila, Texas and New Mexico with its presidios and all other administrative divisions that are situated in the established line on them from the Gulf of California to the Bay of the Holy Spirit, according to my rules and actual instruction given on September 10, 1772, that you shall observe in the most timely and in the same way as I was committed to my viceroy of New Spain.

The new boundary was intended to give a unified military command to the northern provinces of New Spain, to improve their defense and promote the expansion and colonization of the territory, which was threatened by the expansion of Russia, France, the United Kingdom, and the new republic of the United States. The greatest threat, however, were the incursions and indigenous rebellions. Croix in the instructions from the king ordered that the Captaincy General were only nominally under the Viceroy:

Although all of the provisions and orders of your government and captaincy general would depend on just my real person and orders that I reserved directs the Indies route, you shall give notice to the viceroy of New Spain about interesting news and notable occurrences that may occur in the provinces under your control, in order that the higher head of the kingdom be informed about all that ensues in their domestic countries and provide the assistance that you will need as you command whenever you ask for it .... I further declare that in the provinces of your government You have to exercise the general superintendence of my real estate immediately under my real person and the reserved track of Indies, and by the laws the viceroys have of those domains and will continue that viceroy from the kingdom of Mexico for all the rest of New Spain. I also grant broad powers to the same laws of the Indies law with the viceroys and governors exercising my royal patronage.

The King ordered that the headquarters of the commandant was initially going to be the town of Arizpe, and it may choose a different place if it suited him. Arizpe was the headquarters of the experimentally created Intendency by Gálvez in 1770, which covered the government of Sonora and Sinaloa:

With the purpose that you always fall into the faculties to visit or give appropriate orders to the most distant places of your government, you will establish the capital of your residence in the town of Arizpe, situated on the Sonora river and close to the frontier of that province, being almost equidistant from the Californias and Nueva Vizcaya; and of course you can stay at the house next to the church that produced expatriate missionaries, meantime in another building in the same town or wherever convenient.

Teodoro de Croix arrived to Mexico City in December 1776 and from there he began his tenure as Captain general in February 1777, arriving at the city of Durango in September of the same year. After inspecting the provinces of Coahuila, Texas and Chihuahua, he came to Arizpe in the province of Sonora in October 1779 to set up his residence, declaring it the capital of the Captaincy on January 12, 1780. In Arizpe, Croix created a house Currency and in 1782 he created the Bank of San Carlos. Pedro Galindo Navarro was appointed as a judge advocate and adviser.

Due to the extent of its jurisdiction in 1782 Croix requested the appointment of an inspector commander, Brigadier Felipe de Neve, the Governor of the Californias, would be appointed as such.

On March 17, 1783, the king decided to create the Bishopric of Sonora, comprising the province of the same name and the provinces of Californias and Sinaloa, and was appointed Francisco Antonio de los Reyes as the first bishop. Las Californias were separated from the bishopric of Guadalajara, while the province of Sonora and Sinaloa was formerly under the bishopric of Durango.

Teodoro de Croix remained in office until August 1783 when he was appointed viceroy of Peru, being succeeded by the then Inspector General of the Interior Provinces, Felipe de Neve, who was the Captain general until his death on August 21, 1784.

On May 21, 1785, the districts of Saltillo and Parras were separated from the province of Nueva Vizcaya (today states of Chihuahua and Durango) and were incorporated into Coahuila, which was confirmed by the Captain general on May 30, 1787.

=== Division into three military districts ===
By instructions of the Real Audiencia of Guadalajara Colonel Jose Antonio Rengel Alcaraz y Paez temporarily succeeded in office Neve until 1786, when Jacobo de Ugarte y Loyola was appointed, the Spanish king decided that the Commandancy would remain under the jurisdiction of the viceroy Bernardo de Gálvez y Madrid, who was particularly interested in the northern border because he had been governor of the Spanish Louisiana. Rengel decided to move the capital to the town of Chihuahua. On August 26, 1786, the Viceroy gave directions (286 articles) to Captain General to regulate the manner of governing the Interior Provinces. He provided that the general command can be divided into three military districts: one under the direct command of the commander of provinces of Sonora and Sinaloa and the Californias; another commanding 'Juan de Ugalde' with the title of Commander of arms in the eastern part comprising the provinces of Coahuila, Nuevo Reyno de León, Nuevo Santander, Texas, and the districts of Parras and Saltillo; the third military district was under Jose Antonio Rengel Alcaraz y Paez under the title of Inspector Commander, comprising the provinces of Nueva Vizcaya and New Mexico in the western part. At the death of the viceroy Galvez on November 30, 1786, the Captain General regained its autonomy from the new viceroy.

=== Implementation of the Intendency system ===
The Inspector General Galvez proposed to Viceroy Croix in 1769 the creation of the Intendencies of the Californias and Sonora. The viceroy appointed Matías de Armona and then Felipe de Barri for the former and Eusebio Ventura Beleña for the latter, but those projections never reached implementation. On June 18, 1770, the Viceroy Croix appointed Pedro Antarctica as interim mayor of Sonora and operating the Intendency of Arizpe under subordination of the governor of Nueva Navarra until both administrative offices were unified in 1777, remaining Corbalán in these functions until 1787.

As part of the so-called Bourbon reforms on December 4, 1786, King Charles III of Spain signed the Royal Ordinance of Army mayors and province of New Spain that created twelve intendencies in the Viceroyalty of New Spain, replacing by parties the districts, major municipalities and other provincial jurisdictions. The viceroy was confirmed in all its powers, but had to leave the affairs of the Royal Treasury in the hands of a deputy superintendent of Real Property which depended on 11 provincial governors.

The government of Nueva Vizcaya formed the Intendency of Durango, with Felipe Ortega Díaz as its first mayor, and the provinces of Coahuila (Saltillo and Parras included), Texas, Nuevo Reyno de León and Nuevo Santander were under the jurisdiction of the Intendency of San Luis Potosí as to the affairs of the Royal Treasury, while in the same sector the province of Santa Fe de Nuevo México came under direct jurisdiction of the viceroy. Intendency governors gathered under his command causes (or branches of government) of justice, police, finance and war, depending on the Captain General in the first two intendencies of Arizpe and Durango.

Despite the attempt of 1769, the Californias were excluded from the regime of intendencies and tracked affairs regarding the Real Hacienda under the direct supervision of the Captain General, which was expressed in the Article I of the ordinance: "To my royal will, soon to have its due effect, control is now divided into twelve Intendencies, districts of that empire, not including Las Californias".

On March 17, 1787, the Spanish King ordered the creation of the Intendency of Sinaloa, separating it from Arizpe, appointing Colonel Agustín de las Cuentas Zayas as Intendent Governor, but a royal order of July 30, 1789 reversed that creation before it would take effect, de las Cuentas Zayas became Intendent Governor of Chiapas.

On 11 September 1813 the courts in New Spain created the Intendency of Saltillo, including Coahuila, Texas, Nuevo Leon and Nuevo Santander, but failed to be enacted with the repeal of the decree shortly after.

=== Division of the Captaincy General ===
By order of the Spanish King in March 1787 the viceroyal authority was restored to the General Captain and on December 3, 1787, the viceroy Manuel Antonio Flórez Maldonado divided it into two general headquarters separated by the Guanaval River, only as for military jurisdiction, because the intendencies retained their functions:

- General Commandancy of the Western Internal Provinces — comprising the provinces of Sonora and Sinaloa, Las Californias (present day Baja California Peninsula and California), Nueva Vizcaya (present day Durango and Chihuahua), and Santa Fe de Nuevo México (present day New Mexico). Furthermore, Nueva Vizcaya and Nuevo Mexico were broken off into a subdistrict under the control of Joseph Rengel, while Ugarte was appointed as Captain general with jurisdiction over Sinaloa, Sonora, Baja California and Alta California, with Arizpe as his capital. In the last days of 1787, eliminated Regel's separate jurisdiction, adding Nueva Vizcaya and Nuevo Mexico to the jurisdiction of the Commander of the Western Provincias Internas.

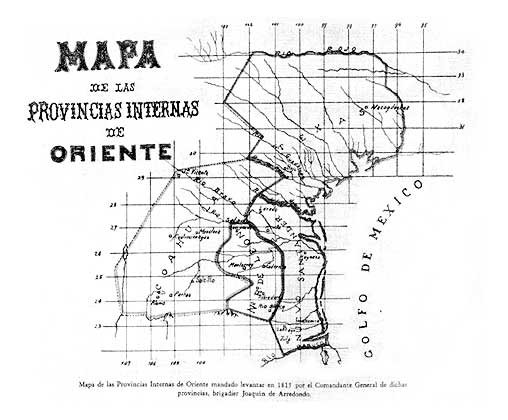
Map of the Eastern Internal Provinces created by Joaquín de Arredondo.

- General Commandancy of the Eastern Internal Provinces — comprising the provinces of Los Tejas (present day Texas, also known as the province of New Philippines), New Kingdom of León (present day Nuevo Leon), Nuevo Santander (present day Tamaulipas and coastal Texas south of the Nueces), and Nueva Extremadura (some of modern Coahuila (although the south-west portion was in the western division and Nueva Vizcaya and the border with the New Kingdom of Leon was disputed and it included parts of present-day Texas south and west of the Medina River just beyond San Antonio), as well as the jurisdictions of Saltillo and Parras. Juan de Ugalde was appointed as the Captain general and Santa Rosa (now Múzquiz) as the capital.

In 1787 it was considered to create a real audiencia with jurisdiction over the Interior Provinces, but the project was not put into effect. The viceroy had a limited authority over the two general headquarters until the King ordered on March 11, 1788, restoring full viceroyal authority over them and abolished the position of Inspector Commander.

In 1790 Ugarte was replaced by Pedro Nava in the west, who in 1791 also served temporarily in the East after the resignation of Ugalde, until the position was occupied by Ramón de Castro y Gutierrez.

=== Reunification ===
In November 1790, King Charles IV stated that the General captaincy be reunited again and independent from the control of the Viceroy, but returned to undergo changes in 1791 and by royal order on 24 November 1792 returned to the control of the Viceroy. Pedro Nava took power in 1793 as Captain general without any dependence of the viceroy, also gaining autonomy against the superintendent of the Royal Treasury of Mexico. Nava relocated the capital to the town of Chihuahua. It was decreed in 1793 that provinces of Californias, the Nuevo Reyno de León (New Kingdom of León) and Nuevo Santander were placed under military governors directly subject to the viceroy and separated from the Commandancy General.

On 28 March 1797 the military engineer Juan de Pagazaurtundúa, who was stationed in the Interior Provinces, sent a letter to Lieutenant General Luis Huet entitled Sucinta Descripción de las Provincias Internas ('Succinct Description of the Internal Provinces') in which he described the Internal Provinces and their respective geographic features

=== New division ===
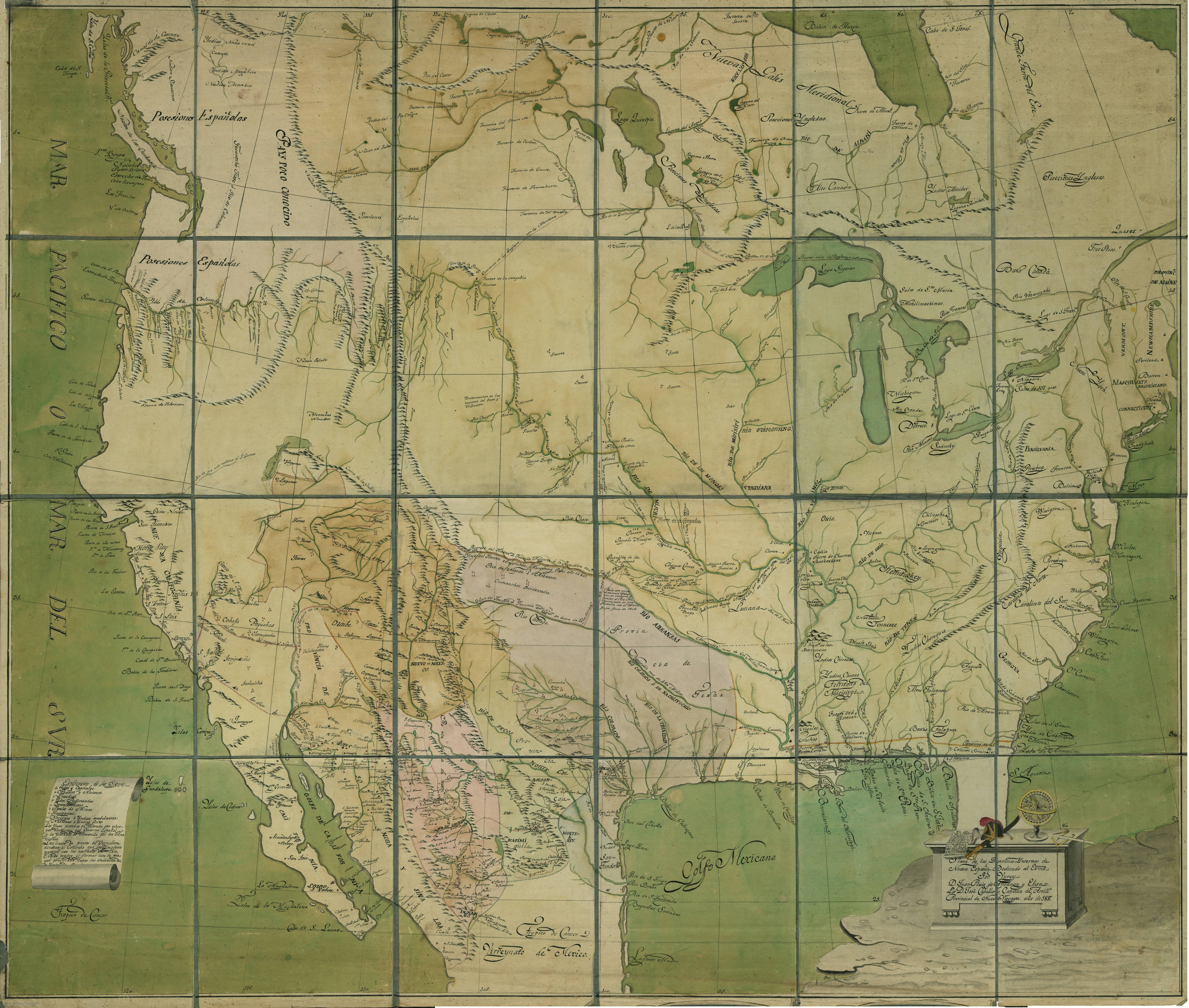
1817 Spanish Map of the Internal Provinces of New Spain.

Nava was the Captain general until 1804, when it was replaced by Pedro Grimarest and soon after by Nemesio de Salcedo. On 30 May 1804 the King ordered a new headquarters division of East and West, but the order was not fulfilled. On 1 May 1811 the King again ordered the division of the general commandancy, but was delayed until Salcedo was replaced in 1813 by two commanding generals Simon Herrera and Leyva (replaced that year by José Joaquín de Arredondo) on the east and Bernardo Bonavia y Zapata in the West. Arredondo remained in government until 1817, while Bonavia y Zapata was replaced that year by Alejo García Conde, who ruled until 1821.

In 1810 started the war of independence in New Spain. Miguel Hidalgo appointed colonel José María González de Hermosillo to the Interior Provinces to spread the insurrection. González de Hermosillo managed to occupy El Rosario on December 21, 1810. He and his troops loot the Arizpe's Royal office, then was totally defeated by Mayor Brigadier Alejo García Conde in San Ignacio Piaxtla on February 7, 1811, returning with the remains of his division to Jalisco.

Nuevo Santander in 1812 returned to join the Eastern Internal Provinces.

In March 1812 the Constitution of Cádiz was sanctioned, then the viceroyalty was divided in provinces governed by "Special political Governors". This constitution stated that the Spanish territories North America with a legal definition were composed of: New Spain to New Galicia and Yucatán, Guatemala, Eastern Internal Provinces and Western Internal Provinces.

By a decree of 1812 county councils were created in the territories named in the constitution:

- Provincial Government of the Eastern Internal Provinces based in Monterrey, comprising the governments of Nuevo Leon, Coahuila, Nuevo Santander, and Texas.
- Provincial Government of the Western Internal Provinces based in Durango, comprising the municipalities of Arizpe and Durango and the governments of New Mexico, Baja California and Alta California.

On 4 May 1814, King Ferdinand VII annulled the Constitution of Cádiz and the Viceroyalty of New Spain was restored on August 11, 1815, dissolving county councils before they had been established in the Interior Provinces. On 7 March 1820, as consequence of the liberal revolution in Spain, Constitution of Cádiz was restored and the viceroyalty finally disappeared on May 31, 1820, to be sworn by the viceroy. The county councils were then established in the Interior Provinces.

In 1819, the Adams–Onís Treaty was ratified between Spain and the United States of America, which set the limit of the Interior Provinces with the latter country, confirming the Spanish possession from Texas and to the Oregon Territory and Nootka.

On August 4, 1821, insurgent Celestino Negrete began the siege of the city of Durango, which was defended by the governor intendant Diego García Conde and marshal José de la Cruz, ending with their decision on September 6. On August 14, 1821, the Iturbidist Gaspar Antonio López took over as Captain general of the Eastern Internal Provinces in Monterrey. While, in the Western Internal Provinces Captain General Alejo García Conde pact with Negrete and joined the Plan of Iguala proclaimed by Agustín de Iturbide, making him swear it in Chihuahua on August 26 and then in Arizpe on September, 6. The governor of Baja California, Fernando de la Toba, acceded to independence in 1822, ending the Spanish rule in northern New Spain.

== Society ==
The finances of the Provincias Internas were subsidized by a situado ('subsidy') from the royal treasury of Mexico City. The first capital of the Commandancy General was Arizpe in Sonora. The provinces that had been incorporated into the new district had been, and continued to be, under the jurisdiction of the Real Audiencia of Guadalajara. They were also different in culture from those of New Spain proper. Whereas the southern provinces of New Spain had been the site of complex, settled societies—such as the Mexica, the Zapotec, Mixtec and the Purépecha—at the time of the conquest, the areas under the Audiencia of Guadalajara had not. Instead the semi-nomadic peoples (referred to at the time by the Nahuatl term, Chichimeca) that lived in this more arid region (and who had resisted Spanish incursions into the area) had either been pushed onto marginal lands or been absorbed into a new Hispanic culture that emerged in the haciendas, towns and cities near the many silver mines that promoted European settlement of this region from Spain and Catholic regions in Europe under Spanish control such as parts of Italy, Netherlands, Belgium and present day Germany.

In the northern Provincias Internas, skirmishes between Spanish settlers (later Mexican nationals) and the indigenous peoples, extended even after the Mexican independence well into the 19th century. This was noted by the German scientist, geographer and explorer Alexander von Humboldt in his Essai politique sur le royaume de la Nouvelle-Espagne:

This struggle with Indians, which has lasted for centuries, and the necessity in which the colonist, living in some lonely farm, or travelling through arid deserts, finds himself of perpetually watching after his own safety, and defending his flock, his home, his wife, and his children against incursions of wandering Indians; and, in short, that state of nature which subsists in the midst of the appearance of an ancient civilization, have all concurred to give to the character of the inhabitants of the north of New Spain an energy and temperament peculiar to themselves. To these causes we must no doubt add the nature of the climate, which is temperate, an eminently salubrious atmosphere, the necessity of labour in a soil by no means rich or fertile, and the total want of Indians and slaves who might be employed by the whites for the sake of giving themselves up securely to idleness and sloth. In the Provincias Internas the development of physical strength is favoured by a life of singular activity, which is for the most part passed on horseback.

— Humboldt, 1811

Some indigenous groups such as the Coahuiltecans of the northeast, disappeared by the mid-19th century because of displacement, disease and war against Spanish-Mexican settlers and Comanche attacks. Mestizaje (miscegenation) was rare compared to other provinces of New Spain. Many indigenous groups rejected conversion to Catholicism and incorporation into the Hispanic society, racial segregation being common.

It is probable that the copper-coloured individual would rather choose to live in a village inhabited by other individuals of his own race, than to mix with whites who would domineer over him with arrogance.

— Humboldt, 1811

=== Demographics ===
Population Statistics of the comandancy of Internal Provinces (Revillagigedo census 1790)
Province/Territory	Pop Spaniards/Criollo 1790	% pop 1790	Mestizo, Castizo and other castes 1790	% pop 1790	Indians 1790	% pop 1790	Total Population	Inhabitants per Sq.League
Eastern Internal Provinces
New Kingdom of León	27,412	63%	13,838	32%	2,431	5%	43,739	17
New Santander	14,639	26%	28,825	51%	13,251	23%	56,715	11
Coahuila or New Extremadura	13,285	32%	17,215	40%	12,411	28%	42,937	6
Texas	1,326	41%	1,083	32%	912	27%	3,334	N/A
Western Internal Provinces
Durango	35,992	21%	77,302	43%	63,890	36%	177,400	10
New Navarre	38,640	29%	35,766	26%	60,855	44%	135,385	7
New Mexico	Unknown	-%	23,628	-%	10,557	-%	-	-
Californias
Old or Lower (Baja)	Unknown	-	2,325	-	2,153	-	4,496	-
New or Upper (Alta)	Unknown	-	18,780	-	2,052	-	20,871	10

According to Humboldt, Spanish and Criollo people comprised the majority of the inhabitants in the Provincias Internas by 1810. This was caused by the arrival of more waves of new Spanish settlers, racial segregation among castes and especially by a catastrophic decrease in numbers of the indigenous peoples.

== Administrative reorganization ==
In the decades that lead up to Spanish American wars of independence, the Provincias Internas were restructured four times. In 1786 the Provincias Internas were split into three commands: the Western Internal Provinces (Sonora y Sinaloa) under the Commander General; the Central Internal Provinces (Nueva Vizcaya and Nuevo México) under the Viceroy; and the Easter Internal Provinces (Coahuila y Tejas, with Nuevo León and Nuevo Santander as well) also under the Viceroy. A year later this complex arrangement was changed to just two Western and Eastern districts. In 1792 the Commander General was put back in charge of a remnant Provincias Internas consisting of Sonora y Sinaloa, Nueva Vizcaya, Nuevo México, Coahuila y Tejas. Las Californias was also under his jurisdiction but the Viceroy oversaw him on matters in this province. Finally the Western and Eastern district arrangement was returned in 1811, but with the viceroy ultimately in charge.

== See also ==
- List of governors in the Viceroyalty of New Spain
- Territorial evolution of Mexico
- Spanish Texas
- Reconquista (Mexico)

== Bibliography ==
- Gálvez, Bernardo de (1967) [1786]. Instructions for Governing the Interior Provinces of New Spain, 1786. New York: Arno Press.
- Gerhard, Peter. The North Frontier of New Spain. Princeton, Princeton University Press, 1982.
- De la Teja, Frank and Ross Frank (2005). Choice, Persuasion, and Coercion: Social Control on Spain's North American Frontiers. Albuquerque: University of New Mexico Press. ISBN 0-8263-3646-9
- Tenenbaum, Barbara A. "The Making of a Fait Accompli: Mexico and the Provincias Internas, 1776-1846" in Jaime E. Rodríguez O., The Origins of Mexican National Politics, 1808-1847. Wilmington, Scholarly Resources, 1997. ISBN 0-8420-2723-8
- Weber, David J. New Spain's Far Northern Frontier: Essays on Spain in the American West, 1540-1821. Albuquerque, University of New Mexico Press, 1979. ISBN 978-0-8263-0498-8
- Weber, David J. The Spanish Frontier in North America. New Haven: Yale University Press, 1992. ISBN 978-0-300-05917-5
- Weber, David J. The Mexican Frontier, 1821-1846: The American Southwest under Mexico. Albuquerque, University of New Mexico Press, 1982. ISBN 978-0-8263-0602-9
