= Audiencia =

Audiencia, Spanish for a hearing or audience, may refer to:

- Real Audiencia, a type of royal court in late medieval Spain and among Spain's colonies
  - Real Audiencia of Manila, in the Spanish East Indies
  - Real Audiencia of Mexico, in New Spain
  - Real Audiencia of Quito, in Nueva Granada
- Audiencia Nacional of Spain, a Spanish court created in 1977
