= Nueva Vizcaya, New Spain =

Former province in New Spain

New Biscay Nueva Vizcaya
- 1562–1821
- Nueva Vizcaya in northwestern Mexico
- Capital: Victoria de Durango
- Government
  - Type: Viceroyalty
- Governor-General
  - 1562: Francisco de Ibarra
- History
  - Established: 1562
  - Mexican Independence: September 27 1821
| Succeeded by |
| Chihuahua (state); Durango |

Nueva Vizcaya (New Biscay, Basque: Bizkai Berria) was the first province in the north of New Spain to be explored and settled by the Spanish. It consisted mostly of the area which is today the states of Chihuahua and Durango and the southwest of Coahuila in Mexico as well as parts of Texas in the United States.

== Early exploration and the Viceroyalty ==
Spanish exploration of the area began in 1531 with Nuño Beltrán de Guzmán's expedition. He named the main city he founded Villa de Guadalajara after his birthplace and the area he conquered "Conquista del Espíritu Santo de la Mayor España" ("Conquest of the Holy Spirit of Greater Spain"). The Spanish regent Queen Joanna replaced this with Nuevo Reino de Galicia ("New Kingdom of Galicia").

Especially under the leadership of Francisco de Ibarra, settlements moved north into the interior of the continent after silver was discovered around Zacatecas. Ibarra named the new area Nueva Vizcaya after his homeland in Spain, Biscay. Nueva Vizcaya included the modern Mexican states of Chihuahua and Durango, the eastern parts of Sonora and Sinaloa (it seems to have included all areas in those provinces under Spanish control until near the end of the 17th-century, but there were eventually split off in what was by the 1730s designated as New Navarre) and the southwest part of Coahuila. The region was under the jurisdiction of the Royal Audience of Guadalajara and the administration of its president.

As part of the Bourbon Reforms, the northern provinces of the Viceroyalty were organized into the Commandancy General of the Internal Provinces of the North in 1777. The Internal Provinces were originally designed to function independently from the New Spanish Viceroy, but being financially supported by him, they soon lost their autonomy. In 1787, an intendancy was established in Durango to promote economic and population growth. Another intendancy was also set up at Arizpe, Sonora. In 1788, the Internal Provinces were divided into two Commandancies, east and west. From 1788 to 1793, Nueva Vizcaya became part of the Western Internal Provinces, until the two Commandancies were reunited. The Crown restored the dual Commandancies again in 1813, and this division remained until independence in 1821.

== War of independence ==
The Mexican War of Independence started in 1810. Nueva Vizcaya was not spared. A month before Miguel Hidalgo’s capture, a number of insurgents were detained, and a conflict at San Francisco between several hundred men occurred early in 1812.

After the call of the Junta to reconvene the Cortes of Cádiz, Nueva Vizcaya elected Juan José Guereña as their deputy to the Cortes. Guereña served from April 4, 1811, until his death on September 10, 1813, and was a signatory of the Spanish Constitution of 1812. The Constitution was well received in the provinces, but was suspended by the viceroy in 1813. Colonial liberals who supported the Constitution continued both legal and extra-legal efforts to reinstate it. Towards the end of 1814, José Félix Trespalacios and Juan Pablo Caballero planned an outbreak at Chihuahua but the plot was revealed to Commandant General García Conde, who now controlled the western section from that city. He promptly arrested the principal plotters, but the men were pardoned through the efforts of authorities and clergy. A brief rebellion by the Opatas of Durango in 1820 was quelled without any serious bloodshed.

The war also imperiled the northern frontier. The trade and tribute system, which the Viceroyalty had established at the end of the 18th century to pacify the nomadic tribes, had broken down due to the war. During this period Chihuahua began to suffer from renewed Apache raids. At the same time the Jesuits, who had been suppressed decades earlier, were permitted to reëstablish their missions. Tensions grew with the young United States, which followed the French boundaries of the recently purchased Louisiana Territory, including several areas which Spain considered its own. In 1819, explorer Zebulon Pike was sent to explore the disputed territory and was arrested by the authorities.

== Independent Mexico ==
When the Spanish Constitution was restored in 1821, Mariano de Urrea was installed as Jefe Político (governor) of Nueva Vizcaya, while Antonio Cordero y Bustamante, who had governed effectively in Durango as civil and military governor during the past three years, was rewarded with the post of Commandant General of the West, replacing Diego García Conde.

A turning point came later that year, when General Agustín de Iturbide rose against the viceregal authorities. The Governor and Intendant of Nueva Galicia, General José de la Cruz, retreated to Durango to make a final effort in behalf of the royalist cause. He entered that city on July 4, 1821, with a force of several hundred soldiers accompanied by fleeing officials from Zacatecas and nearby localities. Iturbide's lieutenant, Pedro Celestino Negrete, followed in pursuit and laid siege to the city early in August with about 3,000 men. De la Cruz held out for over three weeks. His forces suffered severe losses during the fighting which involved heavy shelling and occasional sorties. On August 30, Negrete finally found a vulnerable point in de la Cruz's defenses and placed an artillery battery against it, gaining a decisive advantage. His forces diminished by many defections, de la Cruz accepted a truce on September 3 and the garrison surrendered. They were treated with full honors and permission to leave the country for Spain.

In less than a year, the First Mexican Empire collapsed. Troops rose against the now-Emperor Iturbide. Chihuahua joined the rebellion. Durango was initially against the movement, but on March 5, 1823, the troops and the general population in the region declared themselves in favor. Commandant General Cordero y Bustamante resigned, as did the civil and military Governor of Durango, Brigadier I. del Corral. Gaspar de Ochoa became the new Commandant General and Juan Navarro became Governor of Durango.

=== Creation of the Federal States of Chihuahua and Durango ===
On July 19, 1823, the Supreme Congress decreed the division of Nueva Vizcaya into two provinces, Chihuahua and Durango. The capital of Chihuahua received the title of city and became the seat of a provincial council (diputación provincial). Chihuahua, with a population of over 100,000, benefited from a separate administration. It had often found Durango distant and sometimes uncooperative. In the meantime, as a new constitution was being written for the nation, the Mexican provinces transformed themselves into states. A party from Chihuahua and Durango temporarily persuaded the Congress to create a new state — Estado Interno del Norte — by reuniting the two former provinces and including New Mexico. Its capital was at Chihuahua. Durango, however, raised objections, demanding retention of the capital or separation from the new state, because of its large population and superior resources. On May 22 and July 6, 1824, the separation was affirmed. New Mexico was transformed into a separate territory directly administered by the federal government. In the following year the two states issued their constitutions. Chihuahua established a legislative council of not less than eleven deputies, while Durango created bicameral state legislature, with a senate of seven members and a lower house.

== See also ==
- History of Mexico
- List of governors of New Vizcaya
