= Eusebio Sánchez Pareja =

Spanish colonial official

Eusebio Sánchez Pareja (in full, Eusebio Sánchez Pareja y Beleño) was a Spanish colonial official in New Spain. From November 9, 1786 to May 8, 1787 he was interim viceroy of the colony.

== Biography ==
Sánchez Pareja twice served as governor and commanding general of Nueva Galicia and president of the Audiencia of Guadalajara. The first time was from 1771 to 1776. Then he was briefly replaced by Ruperto Vicente de Luyando. But he returned to office on April 22, 1777, and served until 1786. His salary was 6,500 pesos annually. In 1780 he had a map of Nueva Galicia prepared. In 1784, he issued hygiene regulations for the cleaning of slaughterhouses, streets and the jail, and the disposal of waste. He prohibited bathing in the river.

In 1786 Bernardo de Gálvez, conde de Gálvez, the viceroy of New Spain, became seriously ill. He turned over his duties to the Audiencia on November 8, 1786. Sánchez Pareja was named acting viceroy by the head of the Audiencia, Señor Villaurutia. On November 30, 1786, Gálvez died. Sánchez Pareja was himself old and sick; however he continued to serve as interim viceroy until May 8, 1787, when Gálvez's replacement, Alonso Núñez de Haro, took office.

== See also ==
- List of Viceroys of New Spain
