= Real Audiencia of Guatemala =

Appellate court in the Imperial Spanish territory of the Captaincy General of Guatemala

The Real Audiencia of Santiago de Guatemala (Spanish: Audiencia y Cancillería Real de Santiago de Guatemala), simply known as the Audiencia of Guatemala or the Audiencia of Los Confines, was a Real Audiencia (appellate court) in the Imperial Spanish territory in Central America known as the Captaincy General of Guatemala (1609-1821). The Audiencia's presiding officer, the president, was the head of the government of the area. The Audiencia was initially created by decrees of November 20, 1542 and September 13, 1543, and had its seat in Antigua Guatemala.

== Antecedents ==
The colonization of the area that became the future kingdom began in 1524. In the north, the brothers Gonzalo and Pedro de Alvarado, Hernán Cortés and others headed various expeditions into present-day Guatemala and Honduras. In the south, Francisco Hernández de Córdoba, acting under the auspices of Pedrarias Dávila in Panama, moved into what is today Nicaragua.

The capital of Guatemala moved several times in the first decade of its existence. In 1540 the city of Santiago de los Caballeros de Guatemala was founded after Tecpán Guatemala was abandoned due to its vulnerability to attack. However, the second settlement was destroyed in 1542 by a flood, and the new capital of Antigua Guatemala was founded to replace the old capital. Although the city of Antigua Guatemala became one of the richest of the New World capitals in the subsequent centuries, this city was in turn ordered abandoned in 1776, after a series of earthquakes destroyed it. The third capital was the modern-day Guatemala City.

In 1543 establishment of the Audiencia defined the territory of the kingdom, which included most of Central America. It was the first institution to define Central America (with the exception of Panama) as a region within the Spanish Empire.

== Initial creation ==
An Audiencia of Los Confines of Guatemala and Nicaragua was created by a royal decree of November 20, 1542, which also established the Audiencia of Lima. The new audiencias divided the territory of the abolished Royal Audiencia of Panama. The governorates of Guatemala, Honduras, Chiapas and Nicaragua, which existed at the time of the decree, were abolished, but some were later restored and new ones created: Honduras in 1552, Soconusco in 1561, Nicaragua in 1565 and Costa Rica in 1574.

The September 13, 1543, decree ordered that the new Audiencia move to Valladolid de Comayagua and that the province of Yucatán be added to its district, but this was not accomplished until 1550.

The Audiencia provisionally moved to Gracias a Dios on May 16, 1544, until the royal decrees of October 25, 1548 and June 1, 1549, ordered its return to Santiago de Guatemala.

A royal decree of July 7, 1550, reiterated that Yucatán be separated from the Audiencia of Mexico and incorporated into the one of Guatemala. Finally a decree of January 20, 1553, transferred the province of Soconusco to the Guatemala Audiencia.

== Move to Panama ==
On September 8, 1563, Philip II decreed that the Audiencia move to Panama, abolishing a separate audiencia for Guatemala. The borders of the new Panama Audiencia were in east, the coast from the Darién River to the Ulúa River; and in the west, the coast from Buenaventura to the Gulf of Fonseca. The rest of the territories of the former Audiencia of Guatemala were transferred to the Audiencia of Mexico.

== Return to Guatemala ==
On January 15, 1568, a decree reestablished the Audiencia of Guatemala with the same jurisdiction as in 1563, but without Yucatán, which became a permanent territory of the Audiencia of Mexico until the beginning of the 19th century. A royal decree of January 25, 1569, transferred once again the governorate of Soconusco from the Audiencia of Mexico to the one of Guatemala.

Law VI (Audiencia y Chancillería Real de Santiago de Guatemala en la Nueva España) of Title XV (De las Audiencias y Chancillerias Reales de las Indias) of Book II of the Recopilación de Leyes de las Indias of 1680—which compiles the decrees of September 13, 1543; August 6, 1556; September 16, 1560; May 31 and June 18, 1568; November 10, 1593; and August 7, 1596—describes the borders, make up and functions of the Audiencia.

In the City of Santiago de los Caballeros of the Province of Guatemala shall reside another Royal Audiencia and Chancery of ours, with a president, governor and captain general; five oidores, who shall also be judges of criminal cases [alcaldes del crimen]; a crown attorney [fiscal]; a bailiff [alguacil mayor]; a lieutenant of the Gran Chancellor; and the other necessary ministers and officials, and which shall have for district the said province of Guatemala; and those of Nicaragua, Chiapas, Higueras, Cabo de Honduras, Verapaz and Soconusco with the Islas de la Costa; bordering its district in the east with the Audiencia of Tierrafirme, in the west with the one of New Galicia, and in the north with it and the North Sea, and in the south with the South Sea. And we order that the governor and captain general of said provinces and the president of the Royal Audiencia of these, have, use and exercise by himself the government of that land and all its district, in the same manner as does our viceroy of New Spain and determine the repartimientos of Indians and appoint other offices, as said Royal Audiencia used to do, and that the oidores do not interfere with these matters, nor that said president interfere in matters of justice and that he sign with the oidores that which they sentence and decree.

== Later developments ==
As part of the Bourbon Reforms in 1786 the crown established a series of intendancies in the area, which replaced most of the older corregimientos. The intendants were granted broad fiscal powers and were charged with promoting the local economy. The new intendancies were San Salvador (El Salvador), Ciudad Real (Chiapas), Comayagua (Honduras), and León (Nicaragua). The Audiencia president and governor-captain general of Guatemala became the superintendente general of the territory and functioned as de facto intendant of Guatemala proper. The agricultural, southern region of Costa Rica remained under a civil and military governor with fiscal oversight of only military expenses; the expenses of the civil government were handled by the intendant of León. These intendancies helped shape local political identity and provided the basis of the future nations of Central America.

== See also ==
- Captaincy General of Guatemala
- History of Central America
  - History of Belize
  - History of Costa Rica
  - History of El Salvador
  - History of Guatemala
  - History of Honduras
  - History of Nicaragua
  - History of Panama
