= Arizpe =

Arizpe Arispe (alternate spelling)
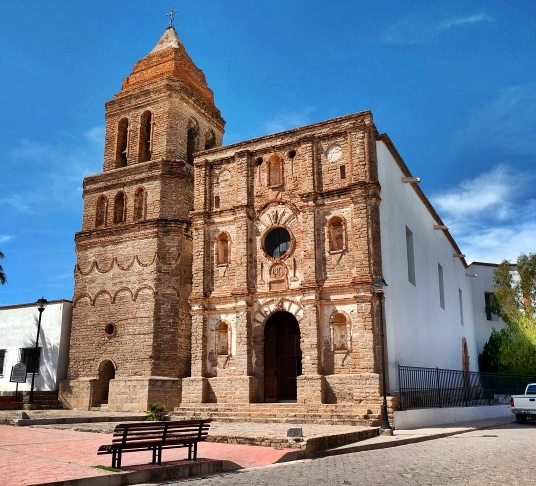
- Nuestra Señora de la Asunción de Arizpe, built ca. 1756

- Location in Sonora Location in Mexico
- Coordinates: 30°19′51″N 110°10′9″W
- Country: Mexico
- State: Sonora
- Municipality: Arizpe

Arizpe (or Arispe) is a small town and the municipal seat of the Arizpe Municipality in the north of the Mexican state of Sonora. It is located at 30°20'"N 110°09'"W. The area of the municipality is 2,806.78 sq.km. The population in 2020 was 1,666, with a population density of 1,365.57 inhabitants per square kilometer.

== History ==
The region of Arizpe was occupied by the Opata people. The name Arizpe is a Basque word "Aritzpe"((H)Aritz meaning Oak and Pe meaning under) and translates to "Under the Oaks".

Arizpe was founded in 1646 as Mission Nuestra Señora de la Asunción de Arizpe by the Jesuit missionary Jerónimo de la Canal.

=== Provincias Internas ===
In dark orange, the territory of the Comandancia y Capitanía General de las Provincias Internas.

In 1776 and 1777, Arizpe was declared a city and made the capital of the Spanish colonial Comandancia y Capitanía General de las Provincias Internas.

The Provincias Internas had jurisdiction over the provinces of:

- Sonora and Sinaloa (present-day Sonora and Sinaloa
- Nueva Vizcaya (present-day Durango and Chihuahua)
- Las Californias (present-day Baja California Peninsula and California)
- Santa Fe de Nuevo México (present-day New Mexico)
- Los Tejas (present-day Texas)
- New Kingdom of León (present-day Nuevo Leon)
- Nuevo Santander (present-day Tamaulipas and southern Texas)
- Coahuila in Nueva Extremadura (present-day Coahuila and Texas south of Nueces River).

The first commandant general was Teodoro de Croix.

=== Juan Bautista de Anza ===
In 1775 an overland expedition, led by Captain Juan Bautista de Anza, of colonial soldiers, missionaries, and settlers was approved by the King of Spain, for a more direct land route to and further colonization of Spanish Alta California. The De Anza Expedition reached San Francisco Bay in 1776, where de Anza located sites for the Presidio of San Francisco and Mission San Francisco de Asis (in present-day San Francisco, California).

The missions in Sonoran territory were later put under the jurisdiction of the new Diocese of Sonora, with the see in Arizpe, erected on May 7, 1779 (the current Archdiocese of Hermosillo).

Juan Bautista de Anza died in 1788 and is buried in Arizpe, at the Church of Nuestra Señora de la Asunción de Arizpe. In 1963, with the participation of delegations from the University of California, Berkeley and UC San Francisco, he was disinterred and reburied in a new marble memorial mausoleum at the same church.

== Economy ==
Agriculture is the main economic activity, with farms lying in the valley of the Sonora River. Most of the crops are grasses used for the raising of cattle. There were over 40,000 head in 2000.

== Tourist attractions ==
The municipal seat has a church and gardens with palm trees. The main church, Templo de Nuestra Señora de la Asunción, was built around 1756 and preserves retablos with oil paintings of saints and wooden and plaster sculptures.

== See also ==
- Municipalities of Sonora

== Other sources ==
- Enciclopedia de los Municipios de México
- Inegi
