= Real Audiencia of Panama =

Governing body and superior court in the Spanish Empire (1538-1751)

The Royal Audience and Chancery of Panama in Tierra Firme (Spanish: Audiencia y Cancillería Real de Panamá en Tierrafirme) was a governing body and superior court in the New World empire of Spain. The Audiencia of Panama was the third American audiencia after the ones of Santo Domingo and Mexico. It existed three times under various guises since it first creation in 1538 until its ultimate abolition in 1751.

== First installation ==
The first Audiencia of Panama was created by Charles V by a royal decree of February 26, 1538. Its initial jurisdiction included the provinces of Tierra Firme (Castilla de Oro and Veragua), all land from the Strait of Magellan to the Gulf of Fonseca, Nicaragua, until 1543 when most of the South American territories were assigned to a new audiencia in Lima. A decree of May 23, 1539, removed the entire province of Nicaragua from the Audiencia of Santo Domingo and placed under the Panama one.

The Audiencia began functioning in Panama City in 1539 with the arrival of the Oidores Francisco Pérez de Robles, Lorenzo Pérez de la Serna, Pedro de Villalobos, and Attorney Alonso de Montenegro. Pérez de Robles served as the first audiencia president and replaced Governor Pedro Vásquez de Acuña. Pérez de Robles carried out his duties until 1543, when the Audiencia was decreed abolished and replaced with an Audiencia of the Confines in Guatemala. During this period the Audiencia supervised various voyages of exploration. Ultimately, the administration of Pérez de Robles proved to be corrupt, resulting in several charges that led to a trial and destitution from office. The investigation and trial (juicio de residencia) were carried out by Pedro Ramírez de Quiñones, who had been appointed corregidor of Panama and Nombre de Dios.

== Second installation ==
On September 8, 1563, Philip II decreed the return of the Audiencia from Guatemala to Panama. The Province of Guatemala was transferred to the Audiencia of Mexico. The work of moving the Audiencia was overseen by Lope García de Castro. The Audiencia began functioning again on May 15, 1565, under interim president Manuel Barrios de San Millán, before the arrival of its permanent president, Alonso Arias de Maldonado. The jurisdiction of the new Audiencia of Panama consisted of territories between Buenaventura in the New Kingdom of Granada and the Gulf of Fonseca.

Law IV (Audiencia y Chancillería Real de Panamá en Tierrafirme) of Title XV (De las Audiencias y Chancillerias Reales de las Indias) of Book II of the Recopilación de Leyes de las Indias of 1680—which compiles the decrees of February 30, 1535; March 1537; February 26 12, 1538; September 8, 1563, November 19, 1570; February 6, 1571; and September 10, 1588—describes the borders and functions of the Audiencia.

In the City of Panama, in the kingdom of Tierrafirme, shall reside another Royal Audiencia and Chancery of ours, with a president, governor and captain general; four oidores, who shall also be judges of criminal cases [alcaldes del crimen]; a crown attorney [fiscal]; a bailiff [alguacil mayor]; a lieutenant of the Gran Chancellor; and the other necessary ministers and officials, and which will have for district the province of Castilla del Oro until Portobelo and its territory; the City of Natá and its territory; the Governorate of Veragua; and by the South Sea towards Peru until the port of Buenaventura, exclusive; and from Portobelo towards Cartagena until the Darien River, exclusive, with the Gulf of Urabá and Tierrafirme; bordering its district in the east and south with those of the Audiencias of the New Kingdom of Granada and San Francisco of Quito, in the west with that of Santiago de Guatemala, and in the north and south with the North and South Seas. And we order that the governor and captain general of said provinces and president of the Royal Audiencia of these, have, use and exercise by himself the government of said Province of Tierrafirme and of all the district of the Royal Audiencia, in the same manner as the viceroys of the Provinces of Peru and New Spain have, and attend by himself all matters and business which arises, regarding the government, and that the oidores do not interfere with these regards, nor that said President interfere in those matters of justice and that he sign with the oidores all that they sentence and decree. We also order that when our viceroys of Peru, as such, decree in certain matter of government, war and administration of our royal treasury, and direct certain dispatches on this to the president and oidores of our Royal Audiencia of Panama, they keep it and make it be kept and fulfilled completely by all, in all the ways and manners in which they have been ordered, without any delay.

In addition a decree of Philip III of July 19, 1614 reiterated, "that the president of Panama obey the viceroy of Peru and have with him regular communication." The Audiencia was abolished once again in 1718 due to bad conduct of its members. This time the Isthmus was placed under the authority of the viceroy and Audiencia of Peru.

== Third installation ==
Nevertheless, this arrangement resulted in problems and poor government for the region, so the crown once more established the Panama Audiencia in a decree of July 21, 1722. From 1739 on, the area of the Panama Audiencia formed part of the recently created Viceroyalty of New Granada. Due to economic problems in Tierrafirme, the crown ordered the final abolition of the Audiencia in a decree of June 20, 1751. A government headed by the regional military commander, the Comandancy General of Tierra Firme, was created in Panama, which was dependent on the viceroy of New Granada in administrative matters. The Comandancy General was originally to be dependent on the Audiencia of Lima in judicial matters, but in 1752 they were transferred to the Audiencia of Bogotá.

== See also ==
- Colonial Panama
- Colonial Central America
- History of Panama
