= Real Audiencia =

Appellate court within Spain and its empire

A Real Audiencia (Spanish pronunciation: [reˈal awˈðjenθja]), or simply an Audiencia (Catalan: Reial Audiència, Audiència Reial, or Audiència), was an appellate court in Spain and its empire. The name of the institution literally translates as Royal Audience. The additional designation chancillería (or cancillería, Catalan: cancelleria, English: chancellery) was applied to the appellate courts in early modern Spain. Each audiencia had oidores (Spanish: 'judges', literally, 'hearers'").

== Audiencias in Spain ==
The first audiencia was founded in the Kingdom of Castile in 1371 at Valladolid. The Valladolid Audiencia functioned as the highest court in Castile for the next two centuries. Appeals from the Castilian audiencias could only be made to the Council of Castile after its creation in 1480.

After the union of the crowns of Castile and Aragon in the Kingdom of Spain and the subsequent conquest of Granada in 1492, the audiencia was divided in two, with the Audiencia of Valladolid taking cases originating north of the Tagus River, and the Royal Audiencia of Ciudad Real (1494) taking cases from south of the river. The second audiencia was moved to Granada in 1505.

Under Charles V and Philip II, the audiencia system was extended first in Spain proper, with the Royal Audiencia of Aragon (1528) and then to the rest of the Spanish Empire. Audiencias in cities and provinces that belong to Spain today included Seville (1566), Las Palmas (1568), Mallorca (1571), Asturias (1717), and Extremadura (1790). The audiencias and viceroys of the Crown of Aragon were overseen by the Council of Aragon, which had been established in 1494.

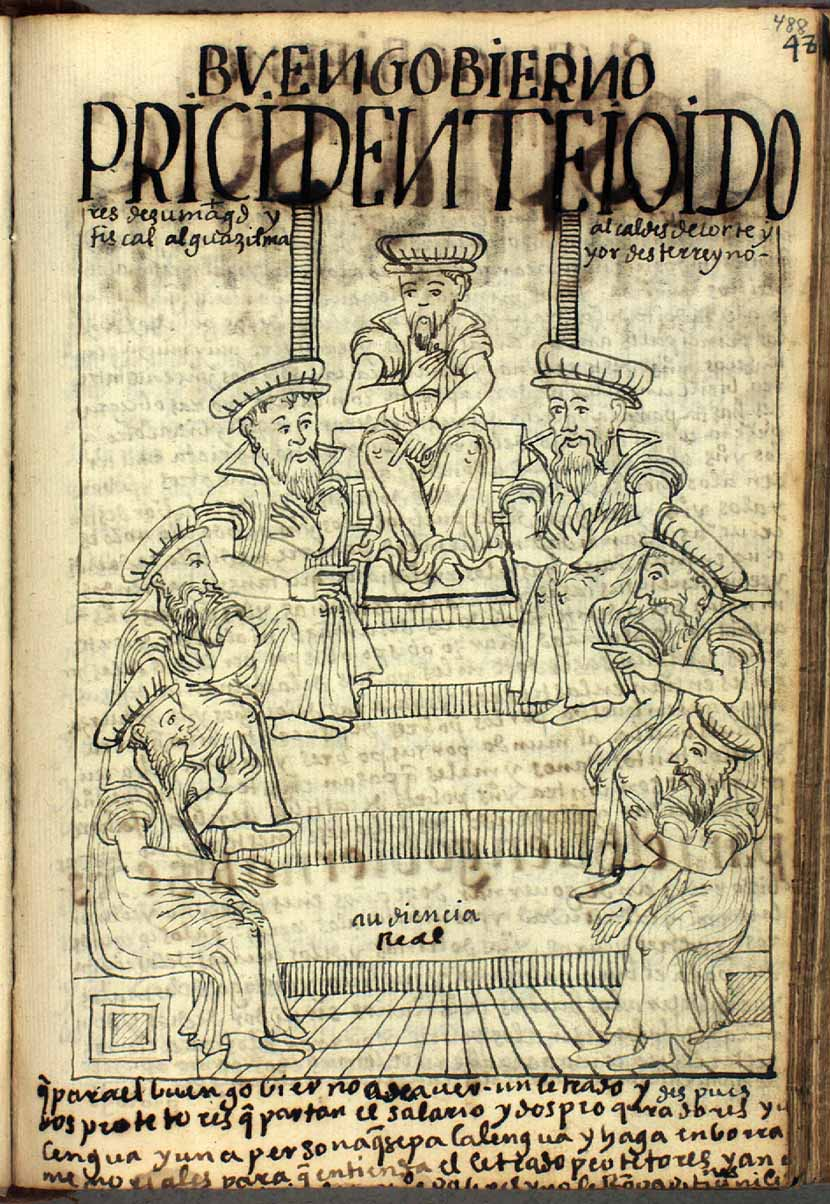
Members of the Real Audiencia of Lima, the presidente, alcaldes de corte, fiscal and alguacil mayor. (Nueva Crónica y Buen Gobierno, p. 488)

== Audiencias in the Americas and the Philippine Islands ==
In the Americas and East Indies, the two institutions were also united, but with a different power relationship. The Crown of Castile early on introduced the audiencia into the Americas as part of its campaign to bring the area and its Spanish settlers and conquerors under royal control. With the vast conquests on the American mainland, which began in the 1520s, it became clear that the audiencia system would not be sufficient to effectively run the overseas government. Viceroys were therefore introduced, but without the judicial powers the office had enjoyed under the Aragonese Crown. In the New World, instead, the audiencias were given a consultative and quasi-legislative role in the administration of the territories. Both viceroys and audiencias were ultimately overseen by a Council of the Indies. Most of the laws dealing with the establishment of the 16th- and 17th-century audiencias can be found in Book II, Title XV of the Recopilación de Leyes de los Reynos de las Indias issued in 1680.

The first audiencia in the Americas was established at Santo Domingo (modern Dominican Republic) in 1511 with jurisdiction over the Caribbean islands and the adjacent mainland. It was quickly suppressed due to opposition by the Spanish settlers, but was re-established permanently in 1526.

As the Spanish conquest of the continent continued, more audiencias were founded in the new areas of settlement. The first mainland audiencia was set up in Mexico City in 1527, just six years after the fall of Tenochtitlan, which had jurisdiction over most of what is now Mexico and Central America.

This audiencia was followed by the Audiencia of Panama, 1538, overseeing Central America and the littoral regions of northern South America until its abolishment in 1543. It later was reestablished with jurisdiction only over Panama proper in 1564, which functioned until 1751.

In 1543 with the abolition of the first Audiencia of Panama, two audiencias were established in its place: one in Guatemala with jurisdiction over Central America and another in Lima with jurisdiction over the newly settled areas of South America, which had been gained by the conquest of Peru and surrounding regions. Venezuela, settled earlier, remained under the jurisdiction of the Audiencia of Santo Domingo until the establishment of the Viceroyalty of New Granada in the early 18th century.

By the end of the 16th century six more audiencias had been established in:

- Guadalajara (Nueva Galicia), 1548, covering what is now northern Mexico
- Santa Fe de Bogotá (Nueva Granada), 1548, overseeing most of modern Colombia
- Charcas (Upper Peru), 1559
- Quito, 1565, with jurisdiction over most of modern Ecuador, the Peruvian Amazon, and Jaén, Tumbes and Popayán provinces
- Concepcíon (Chile), 1565, but which was abolished in 1575
- Manila in 1583 overseeing the Philippines and the Spanish East Indies

In the 17th century two new audiencias were created in:

- Santiago, 1609, replacing the one in Concepción
- Buenos Aires, which only operated from 1661 to 1672.

The last colonial audiencias were created under the Bourbon kings as part of their administrative reforms, which also involved setting up new viceroyalties. The new dynasty found no need for the second Audiencia of Panama and abolished it in 1751, transferring its jurisdiction to the one in Bogotá. New audiencias were established in:

- Caracas, 1786
- Cusco (Peru), 1787
- Buenos Aires, 1783.

This meant that at the moment of Spanish American independence in the early 19th century, the overseas possessions of the Spanish Monarchy were overseen by twelve audiencias. After the loss of Santo Domingo to the French in 1795, the Audiencia of Santo Domingo was transferred to Camagüey, Cuba and renamed the Audiencia of Puerto Príncipe. In 1838 a second Cuban audiencia was established in Havana, and from 1831 to 1853 Puerto Rico had its own audiencia.

=== Duties and composition ===
Unlike their peninsular counterparts, the overseas audiencias had legislative and executive functions in addition to their judicial ones, and thus represented the king in his role as maker of laws and dispenser of justice, as evidenced by the fact that, as chanceries (chancillerías, modern Spanish: cancillerías), they alone had the royal seal. Their importance in handling the affairs of state is reflected in the fact that many of the modern countries of Spanish-speaking South America and Panama have boundaries that are roughly the same as those of the former audiencias. Audiencias shared many government duties with the viceroys and governors-captains generals of the regions they oversaw, and so they served as a check on the authority of the latter.

An audiencia could issue local ordinances and served as a "privy council" to the viceroy or governor-captain general. In this function it often met weekly and was called by the term real acuerdo. An audiencia also oversaw the royal treasury, and when meeting in this capacity with the royal treasurer, it was referred to as a junta de hacienda (literally, "finance board"). The crown attorney (fiscal) also had the right to correspond directly with the crown, especially on treasury issues and acuerdo decisions. In turn, in the viceregal capitals of Spanish America, such as Mexico and Lima, the viceroy himself served as a presidente (president) of the audiencia. Likewise the governor-captain general served in this function in the various audiencias located in the capital of a captaincy general. In both cases the president had no vote in judicial matters, unless he was a trained lawyer, and only oversaw the administration of the court.

The audiencias with a viceroy or captain general in charge were referred to as audiencias pretoriales ("praetorial audiencias"), or occasionally audiencias virreinales ("viceregal audiencias"), in the case of the former. In the remaining audiencias, such as in Quito, where there was no viceroy or captain general, the president of the audiencia served as the main governor of the audiencia district and the region was often referred to as a "presidency," (e.g., the Presidency of Quito). The viceroy retained the right to oversee the administration of these audiencia districts, but could not interfere in judicial matters. These audiencias were referred to as audiencias subordinadas ("subordinate audiencias", although this did not imply that the audiencias pretoriales had the right to hear appeals).

Audiencia officials, especially the president, were subject to two forms of review. At the end of the president's term, a juicio de residencia (literally, "judgement of the period in office") was carried out, which reviewed the president's performance on the job and collected interviews many people affected by the audiencia's performance. Unscheduled inspections, called visitas (literally, "visits"), were also carried out if the crown felt it was needed. As part of the Bourbon Reforms, further limits were placed on viceroys and captains general. The office of regente, a type of chief justice, was created which removed most of the administrative functions from the viceroy or captain general. Their role as audiencia president became honorary. A viceroy or captain general, as the president of the audiencia, was charged by law with corresponding with the audiencia in writing, not in verbal commands. This created a record that could be checked later. Audiencias were styled, as a body, "vuestra merced" ("your grace", in the singular) and addressed directly as "señores."

The size and composition of an audiencia varied over time and place. For example, the first audiencia of Mexico had four oidores, one president and a fiscal, or crown attorney, meeting as only one chamber overseeing both civil and criminal cases. By the 17th century it had grown to two chambers handling civil and criminal cases separately. The civil chamber had eight oidores and one fiscal. The criminal chamber had four alcaldes del crimen (the chamber's equivalent of an oidor) and its own fiscal. In addition the audiencia had sundry other officers such as notaries, bailiffs, and the equivalent of modern public defenders. The smallest overseas audiencias had a composition similar to the early Mexican one.

In their judicial function, an audiencia heard appeals from cases initially handled by justices of first instance, which could be, among others, guild courts, corregidores, and alcaldes ordinarios. (See Fuero.) The audiencia also served as the court of first instance for crimes committed in the immediate jurisdiction of the city that served as the audiencia's seat and any case involving crown officials. In criminal cases the audiencia was the court of final appeal. Only civil cases involving more than 10,000 silver pesos could be appealed to the Council of the Indies, and only then within a statute of limitation of one year.

The fact that Audiencia presidents were not necessarily magistrates or lawyers, but men "clad in sword and cape", meant that they did not have any vote in court cases, and the court was not bound to submit to their authority, deferring ultimately to the crown. Thus, the authority of the president, when he was not a magistrate, was void in judicial matter and merely signed the verdicts. The Audiencias chaired by the viceroy were called viceregal Audiencias, and the chaired ones by a governor-captain general were the pretorial Audiencias.

As the pretorial Audiencias were chaired by a governor-captain general, this situation caused to appear the post of president-governor of major districts, with direct rule over a province and superior control of other provinces included inside the territorial district of the Audiencia, so that they exercised functions similar to the viceroys. Thus, another administrative division appeared: while the territories in charge of a governor were the minor provinces, the juridisdiccional scope of the Audiencias constituted the major provinces.

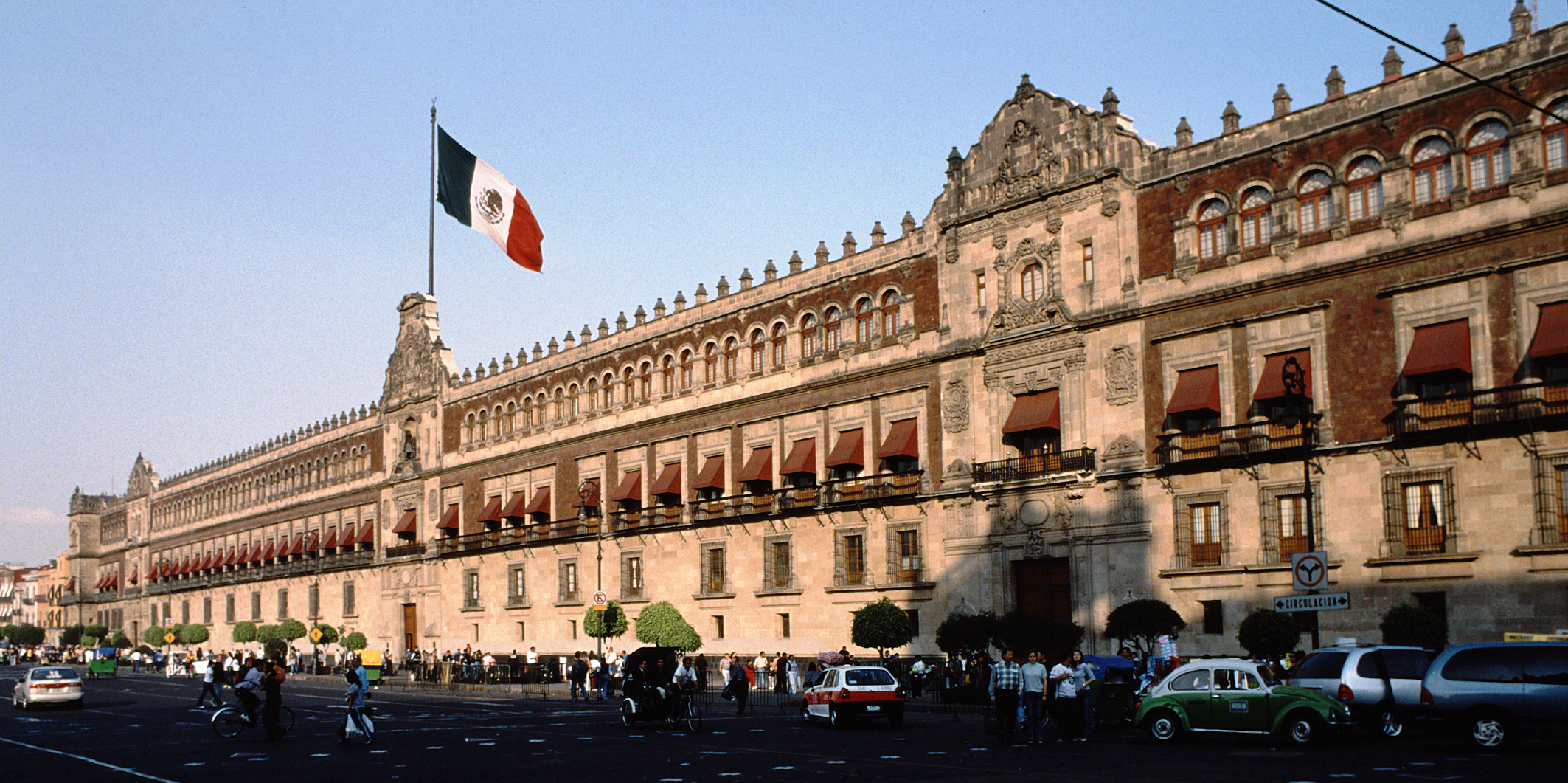
Former Viceregal Palace and seat of the Audiencia of Mexico, since independence in 1821, the National Palace.

The members (oidores) of the Audiencia met with the president in a committee called royal agreement (real acuerdo), to take measurements for the government concerning the review of bylaws, appointments of commissioners (jueces pesquisidores), or retention of bulls, but the advice did not correspond to the Audiencia as institution but to its members as reputable people. The decisions of the royal agreement were established in the concerted writs (autos accordados), nevertheless, there were matters as dispatching the issues of government, in which the Audiencia could not interfere either with the viceroy or the president-governor. This way, the control of the Audiencias over the viceroys enabled to the Crown to control the functions of government of the viceroys.

While the viceregal and pretorial Audiencias were chaired by men clad in sword and cape, the presidents of the subordinated Audiencias were magistrates, so that, in the juridisdiccional scope of the subordinated Audiencias, the functions of government, Treasury and war belonged to the viceroy. Therefore, in these sections of the viceroyalties there were no governors-captains general but Audiencias, and the presidency gave them the name, for example in Charcas and Quito.

Although there were accumulated in the same person the offices of viceroy, governor, captain general and president of the Audiencia, each of them had different jurisdictional areas. The jurisdiction of the viceregal Audiencia, whose president was the viceroy, ended face up to the jurisdiction of other Audiencias inside the same viceroyalty: as the pretorial Audiencias chaired by a governor-captain general, who had administrative, political and military authority, as the subordinated Audiencias, whose president did not have this administrative, political and military authority. Therefore, as governor, the direct administration of the province where was placed the viceregal capital belonged to the viceroy; nevertheless, with respect to the other governorates of the viceroyalty, his function was mere oversight or general inspection over the management of political affairs. The imprecision in defining the powers of the viceroy and those of the provincial governors allowed the Crown to control their officials.

In the viceroyalty of New Spain, the Audiencia of Mexico, chaired by the viceroy, ended its jurisdiction face up to the jurisdiction of other Audiencias of Guatemala (1543–1563; 1568-), of Manila (1583–1589; 1595-), of Guadalajara (established in Compostela in 1548 and transferred in 1560 to Guadalajara) and that of Santo Domingo (1526-). The viceroy of New Spain as governor only had jurisdiction over a more reduced governorate of New Spain, and as captain general his authority did not comprise either the captaincies of Yucatán or the New Kingdom of León, but it comprised the military command over the governorate of Nueva Galicia, which was a territory under the jurisdiction of the Audiencia of Guadalajara, until in 1708 the captaincy general was attached to the governor of this province of Nueva Galicia.

In the viceroyalty of Peru, the viceroy presided the Audiencia of Lima (1542-), and the jurisdiction of this Audiencia ended face up to the jurisdictions of the pretorial Audiencias of Panama (1538–1543; 1563–1717), of Santa Fe de Bogotá (1547-), of Santiago de Chile (in Concepción between 1565 and 1575, and in Santiago de Chile since 1605), and that of Buenos Aires (1661–1672), whose presidents were also both governors and captains general, and in addition to these Audiencias, the viceroyalty comprised the subordinated Audiencias of Charcas (La Plata; 1559-) and Quito (1563-).

== Audiencias in Italy ==
Audiencias in the Spanish possessions in Europe included the Italian domains of Sardinia (1564–1714) and Kingdom of Sicily (1569–1707). In Italy, the Castilian institution of the audiencia was united with the Aragonese institution of the viceroy. The Aragonese viceroys were literally "vice-kings," and as such, had the power to administer justice and issue laws; therefore they were integrally involved in the judicial proceedings of the Italian audiencias. In 1555 a Council of Italy was created to oversee the viceroys and audiencias in Italy.
