= Nuevo Santander =

Region of New Spain

New Santander Nuevo Santander (Spanish)
- 1746–1821
- Cross of Burgundy, flag of New Spain.

- Status: Spanish colony
- Capital: Santander Jiménez
- Common languages: Spanish
- Religion: Roman Catholicism
- Government: Monarchy
- King of Spain
  - July 9, 1746 – August 10, 1759: Ferdinand VI
  - December 11, 1813 – September 29, 1833: Ferdinand VII
- Royal Governor
  - May 31, 1748 - April 8, 1767: José de Escandón
  - July 7, 1821 - September 22, 1822: Felipe de la Garza Cisneros
- Historical era: Colonial era
  - Established: 1746
  - Disestablished: 1821

Population
  - 1790: 43,739
- Currency: Spanish colonial real
Succeeded by
First Mexican Empire
- Today part of: Mexico (Nuevo León & Tamaulipas); United States (Texas)

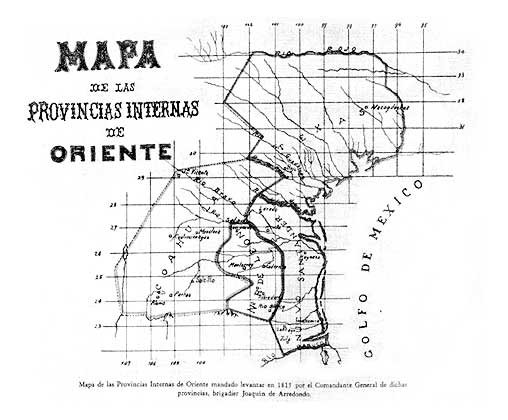
Map of New Spain along the Gulf of Mexico

Nuevo Santander (New Santander) was a region of the Viceroyalty of New Spain, covering the modern Mexican state of Tamaulipas and extending into modern-day southern Texas in the United States.

Nuevo Santander was named after Santander, Cantabria, Spain, and settled by Spanish American colonists in a concerted settlement campaign peaking in 1748–1750. It fell under the jurisdiction of the Real Audiencia of Guadalajara in judicial matters, and in 1776, Nuevo Santander became part of the semi-autonomous Provincias Internas.

In the middle of the XVIII century, Nuevo Santander, the area where South Texas and the State of Tamaulipas currently hold, was populated by multiple tribes. In the Southwest, along the Sierra Madre, were the Pisones, Siguillones, Janambres, and Pames. Just North of Soto la Marina were the Aracates, Maratines, and Damiches. In the Sierra of Tamaulipa Oriental, were the Anancanaes, Mariguanes, Monanas, Palalguepes, Pasitas, Simariguanes, Verjaranos. In the valleys of Tamaulipa Oriental, were the Aribay, Tagualitos, Comecamotes, Aracates, Tagualitos, Inapanames, and Tumapacanes. The northern part of these sierra was the home of the Canaines, Borrados, Guijolotes, and Cadimas. On the coast between Soto la Marina and Tampico, were the Anancana, Aretines, Carimariguayes, Carimariguanes, Cataicanes, Mapulcana, Moraleños, Panguayes, and Zapoteros. Southwest of Tamaulipa Occidental were ther Tamaulipecos and Malincheños. North of the Rio Grande and south of the Nueces river, were the Pintos, Comecrudos, Texedenos, Quinicuanes, and two of the most famous, the Comanches and the Apaches.

José de Escandón founded the colony in 1747. In 1755, Jiménez was founded, which became the major town and capital of the colony. The state was subsequently renamed to Tamaulipas once Mexico gained its independence in 1821.

== See also ==
- Governors of Nuevo Santander
- History of Mexico
- History of Texas
- Brownsville, Texas
- Laredo, Texas
- Blas María de la Garza Falcón
- New Kingdom of León
- Eastern Internal Provinces
