= New Navarre =

Province of the Viceroyalty of New Spain

New Navarre Nueva Navarra
- 1565 – September 1821
- Flag

- New Navarre (1794)
- Status: Part of New Spain
- Capital: Arizpe, Sonora
- Government: Monarchy
- History
  - Established: 1565
  - Disestablished: September 27 1821
Preceded by	Succeeded by
Yaqui; Mayo people	Sonora y Sinaloa

New Navarre (Spanish: Nueva Navarra) was at first an informal name given to the silver-mining region north of Sinaloa. Just before his death in 1711, the Jesuit Eusebio Kino drew a map of the area with that name. New Navarre would have included the Pimería Alta, where Kino spent 24 years establishing missions, along with the Navarrese Juan Matheo Manje. Later Nueva Navarra was a province in the Provincias Internas, one of the frontier provinces of the Viceroyalty of New Spain. Brigadier Pedro de Rivera, who visited the northern presidios from 1724 to 1728, suggested to the viceroy Juan de Acuña, Marquis of Casafuerte, the political and administrative reorganization of the northwest provinces. The viceroy supported the idea, and it was approved by Philip V of Spain in 1732, and executed the following year with the appointment of the first governor, Manuel Bernal de Huidobro, at that time mayor of Sinaloa. In the branches of government, finance and war, the governor was directly subject to the viceroy, while the field of justice was under the jurisdiction of the Royal Audience of Guadalajara (Real Audiencia de Guadalajara) of the Viceroyalty of New Spain. By 1806, the province was generally recognized as Sonora or Nueva Navarra, with the capital in Arizpe, and including the area comprising Sinaloa (de Iriarte, 1806). After Independence Sonora y Sinaloa became one of the constituent states of the Mexican Republic. The Sonoran Desert ecoregion covers much of the state.

In the early years of European migration to Nueva Navarra, the Basques became a significant proportion of the population. The Basque immigrants reached 6% of total migrants in the first 15 years of colonization, the same percentage as those from the Castile or Extremadura, most populated regions. More specific data shows ratios between 8% and 16% of Basques in the nuclei urban settlements of those first decades, indicating a trend which would persist in the future: the Basque-Navarre preference for urban settlement (Boyde-Bowman, 1964).

== See also ==
- Territorial evolution of Mexico
- Spanish missions in the Sonoran Desert
- Spanish colonization of the Americas
