= Nueva Galicia =

Autonomous kingdom in New Spain, Spain

New Kingdom of Galicia Nueva Galicia
- 1531–1824
- Seal

- Capital: Guadalajara; Tepic (1540-1560); Compostela (1531-1540)
- Status: Administrative division of New Spain
- Historical era: Spanish colonization of the Americas
  - Established: 1531
  - Dissolved: 1824 1824
Preceded by	Succeeded by
Kingdom of Xalisco; Tonalá (state)	Intendancy of Guadalajara; Intendancy of Zacatecas
- Today part of: Mexico

Nuevo Reino de Galicia (New Kingdom of Galicia; Galician: Reino de Nova Galicia) or simply Nueva Galicia (New Galicia, Nova Galicia), known in Nahuatl as Chimalhuacán (‘the land of shield bearers’), was an autonomous kingdom of the Viceroyalty of New Spain. It was named after Galicia in Spain. Nueva Galicia's territory consisted of the present-day Mexican states of Aguascalientes, Guanajuato, Colima, Jalisco, Nayarit and Zacatecas.

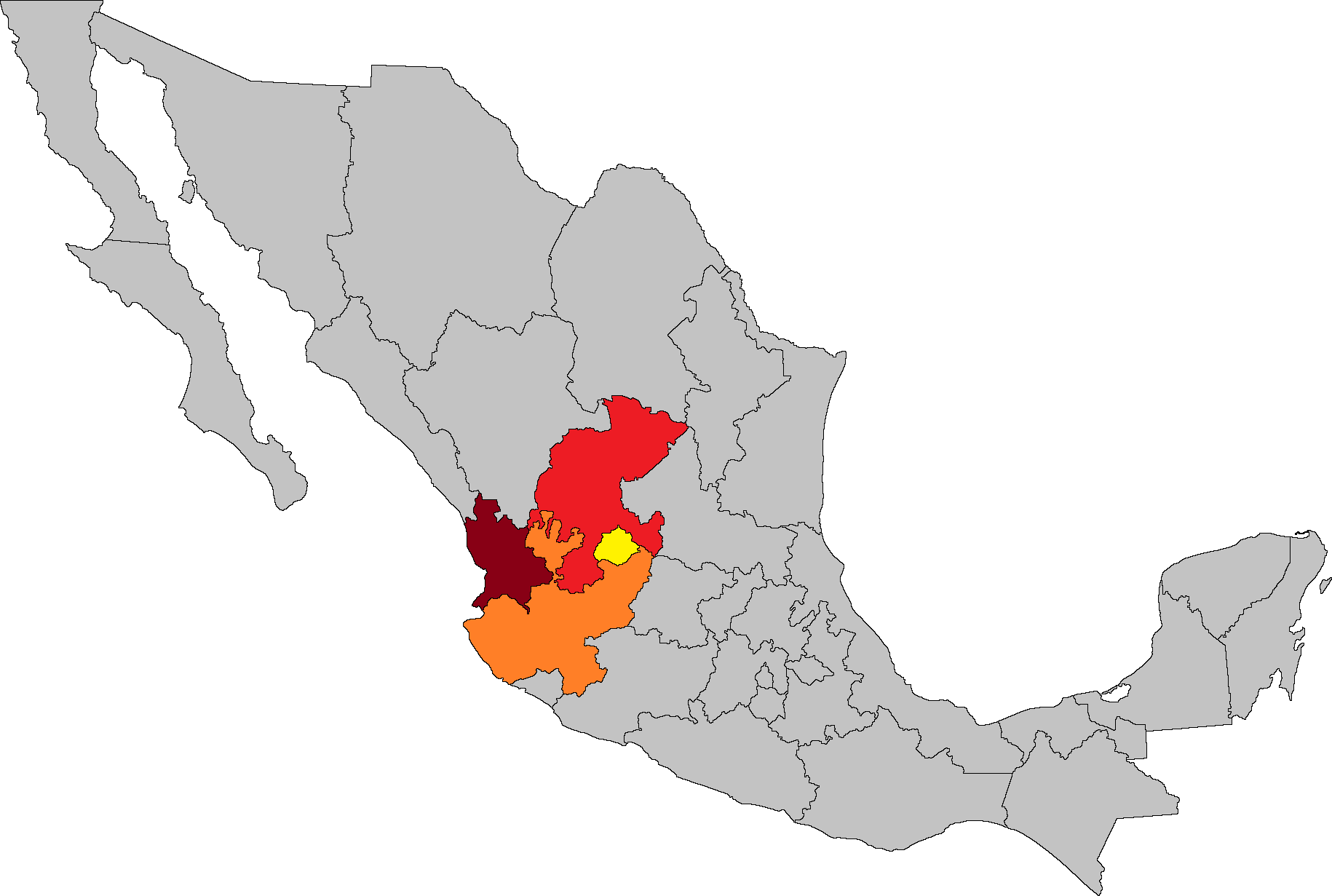
Territories that were a part of Nueva Galicia

== History ==
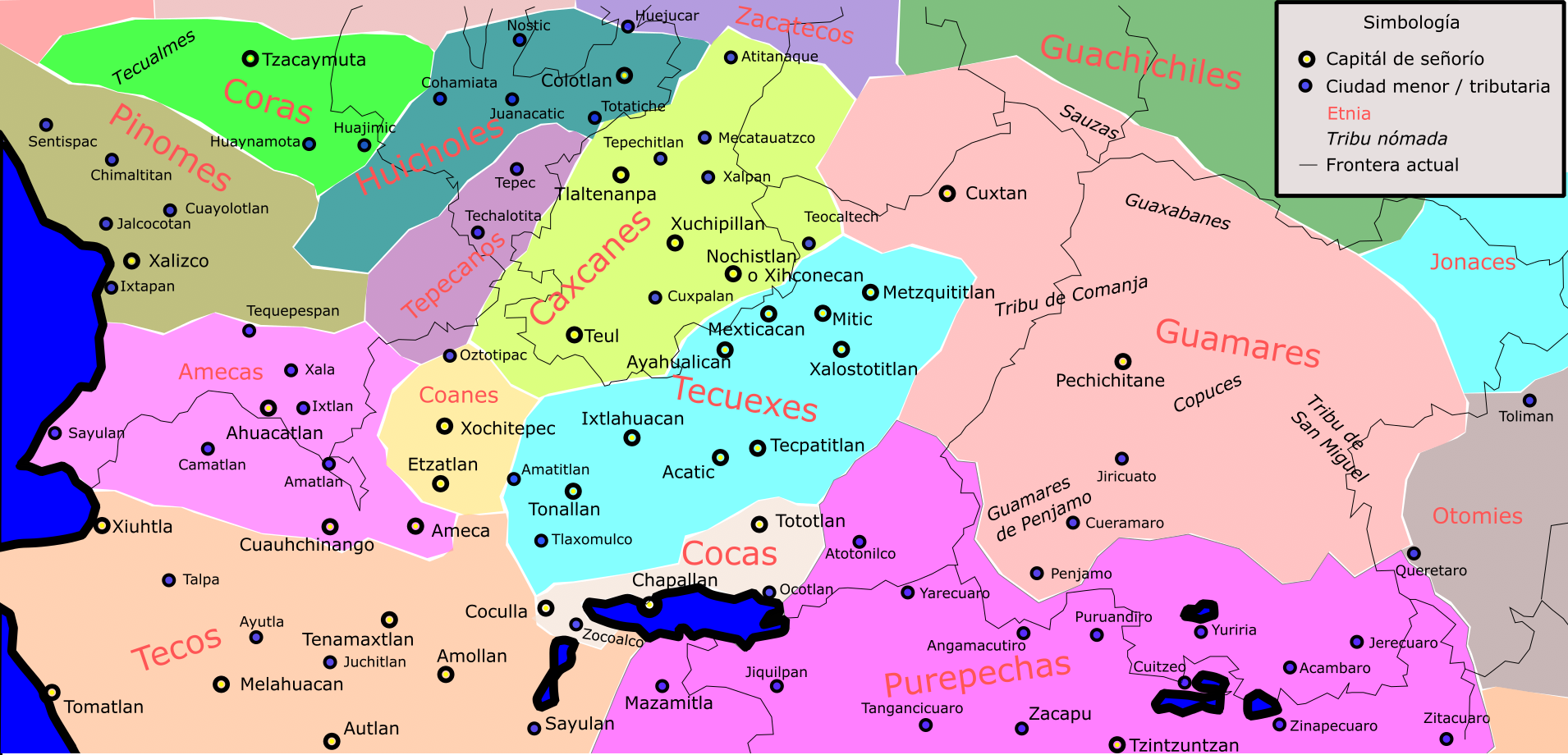
Pre-conquest ethno-demographic map of the area that was to become "New Galicia"

Spanish exploration of the area began in 1531 with Nuño de Guzmán's expedition. He named the main city founded in the area Villa de Guadalajara after his birthplace and called the area he conquered "la Conquista del Espíritu Santo de la Mayor España" ("the Conquest of the Holy Spirit of Greater Spain"). The name was not approved. Instead, Queen Joanna — at the moment the acting regent of Spain — named the area "Reino de Nueva Galicia."

Guzmán's violent conquest left Spanish control of the area unstable, and within a decade full war had reemerged between the settlers and the Native peoples of the area. The Mixtón War, which lasted from 1540–1541, pitted an alliance of Coras, Guachichils and Caxcans against the settlers. Nine years later the Chichimeca War broke out, this time pitting mostly Zacatecos against their former allies, the Caxcan, who had now allied with the Spanish. Nahuas from the Valley of Mexico moved into the region along with the Spanish as the area was settled. In the last decades of the sixteenth century Huichols also arrived.

Given the growing wealth of the region with the discovery of silver to the north, especially in Nueva Vizcaya, Guadalajara became the seat of the second mainland Audiencia of New Spain in 1548. The Audiencia of Guadalajara had oversight of all the northern mainland provinces of the Viceroyalty. The Audiencia at first was subordinate to the Royal Audiencia of Mexico but was made independent in 1572, with a separate governor or president. This enabled New Galicia to be ruled largely separate from the rest of the Viceroyalty.

There are a number of published chronicles on colonial Nueva Galicia. A 1621 account by Domingo Lázaro de Arregui, Descripción de la Nueva Galicia gives considerable information about the indigenous peoples of the area.

In the late 18th century, as part of the Bourbon Reforms, an Intendancy was established in Guadalajara. In 1824, after Mexican independence was consolidated, the kingdom was transformed into the State of Jalisco and the Territory of Colima.

=== First territorial division ===
- Province of Nueva Galicia: Aguascalientes, Nayarit and Jalisco.
- Province of Los Zacatecas: Zacatecas.
- Province of Colima: Colima.

=== Second territorial division ===
- Intendancy of Guadalajara: Aguascalientes, Nayarit, Jalisco and Colima.
- Intendancy of Zacatecas: Zacatecas.

== See also ==
- Real Audiencia of Guadalajara
- List of governors of New Galicia
- La Gran Chichimeca
- History of Mexico
