= Royal Audiencia of Guadalajara =

Tribunal of the Spanish Crown

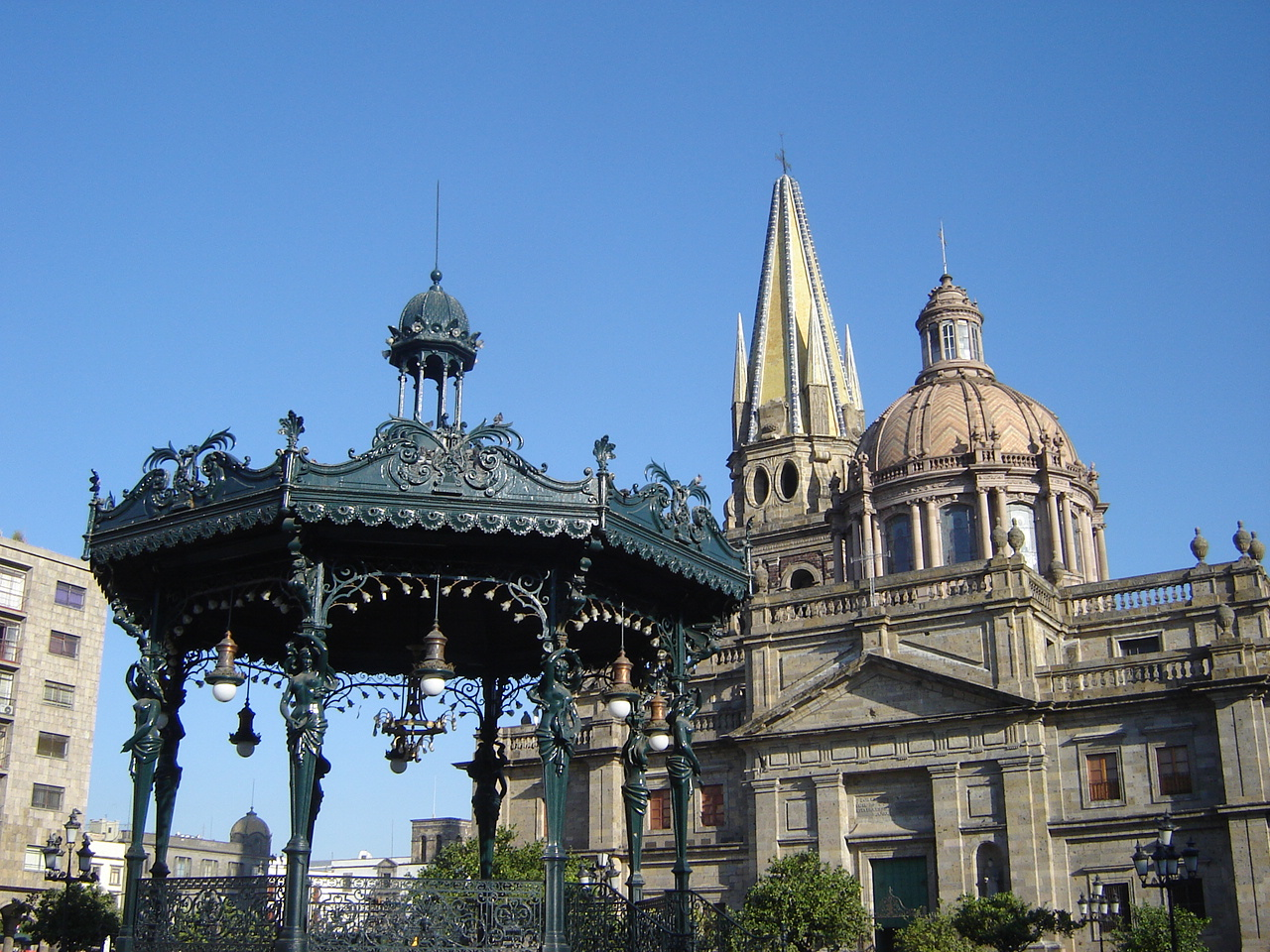
Guadalajara Cathedral

The Real Audiencia of Guadalajara (or Real Audiencia de Nueva Galicia), was the highest tribunal of the Spanish crown in what is today northern Mexico and the southwestern United States in the Viceroyalty of New Spain. It was created by royal decree on February 13, 1548, and was originally located in Compostela and permanently seated in Guadalajara in 1560. Its president was the chief political and executive officer of the district, subordinated only to the Viceroy.

== Structure ==
Law VII (Audiencia y Chancillería Real de Guadalaxara de la Galicia en Nueva España) of Title XV (De las Audiencias y Chancillerias Reales de las Indias) of Book II of the Recopilación de Leyes de las Indias of 1680—which compiles the decrees of February 13, 1548; May 26, 1574; and May 3, 1575—describes the limits and functions of the Audiencia.

In the city of Guadalajara of New Galicia shall reside another Royal Audiencia and Chancellery of ours, with a president, and four judges of civil cases [oidores], who will also be judges of criminal cases [alcaldes del crimen]; a crown attorney [fiscal]; a bailiff [alguacil mayor]; a lieutenant of the Gran Chancellor; and the other necessary ministers and officials; and which shall have for district the Province of New Galicia, those of Culiacán, Copala, Colima, Zacatula, and the towns of Avalos, sharing borders: in the east with the Audiencia of New Spain; in the south with the South Sea; and in the west and north with provinces not yet discovered nor pacified; and the president of said Audiencia of Guadalajara, and not the oidores, shall have the government (gobernación) of its district, and in his absence said Audience of Guadalajara, regardless of whatever decrees in which participation in the government along with the presidents had been conceded to the oidores, which we revoke and annul. And we order that this law of ours be kept, as it is in it contained, and in regards to the government of war and the treasury, the orders, which we have given, be kept.

Law XXXXVII, of the same book and title, reproduced the Decree of Philip III of January 30, 1600, which mandated that when the office of viceroy was vacant, the Audiencia of Mexico became the acting viceroy, directly governing the provinces under its judicial jurisdiction, and oversaw the district of the Guadalajara Audiencia in administrative matters.

== Bibliography ==
- Parry, J. H. (2008) [1948]. The Audiencia of New Galicia in the Sixteenth Century: A Study in Spanish Colonial Government. Cambridge: Cambridge University Press. ISBN 978-0-521-08096-5

== See also ==
- Nueva Galicia
- Nueva Navarra
- Nueva Vizcaya, New Spain
- Nuño Beltrán de Guzmán
- La Gran Chichimeca
- Mixtón War
- Chichimeca War
- Santa Fe de Nuevo México
- Nuevo Santander
- Nuevo Reyno de León
- Commandancy General of the Provincias Internas
