= Real Audiencia of Mexico =

Highest tribunal of the Spanish crown in the Kingdom of New Spain

The Real Audiencia of Mexico or Royal Audiencia of Mexico (Spanish: Real Audiencia de México) was the highest tribunal (high court) of the Spanish crown in the Kingdom of New Spain. The Audiencia was created by royal decree on December 13, 1527, and was seated in the viceregal capital of Mexico City. The First Audiencia was dissolved by the crown for its bungling and corruption and the crown established the Second Audiencia in 1530. This was supplanted by the Viceroyalty of New Spain in 1535. A new Audiencia was created in Guadalajara in western Mexico in 1548.

== Assertion of Royal Control ==
After the fall of Tenochtitlan in 1521 conqueror Hernán Cortés exercised power in New Spain as its first European governor and proceeded to allocate rewards to Spaniards who had participated in the victory. He initially established a government in the town of Coyoacán, south of Lake Texcoco, because Tenochtitlan was in ruins after the conquest. From here he governed with the title of Captain General and Justicia Mayor. In his letters to the king, he explained and justified his actions, arguing that it was necessary to grant rewards of encomiendas to conquerors in order to persuade them to remain in the area now under Spanish control rather than see them depart for conquests elsewhere.

The crown sent treasury officials to New Spain, asserting the right of the crown to the revenues from the newly conquered lands. During Cortés's expedition to Honduras (1524–26), treasury officials were left in charge and the political situation descended into chaos. After Cortés's return to Mexico City in 1526, the crown realized that to assert its power over him that a higher level of royal authority was needed and created the Audiencia of Mexico.

The first Audiencia in Mexico was created in 1528 and headed by crown official Nuño Beltrán de Guzmán. Hernán Cortés, who as leader of the Spanish conquest of the Aztec Empire, had accrued considerable wealth and power after the conquest that was not effectively checked by crown treasury officials. By setting up the Audiencia the crown sought to limit Cortés's personal power by creating the high court as an effective instrument of royal power.

Guzmán was opposed by the first bishop of Mexico, Juan de Zumárraga, an ally of Cortés Guzmán's tenure as the president of the Audiencia was marked by ruthless attacks on his political rivals, corruption, and extreme violence against Indians. One scholar calls him "a natural gangster." However, structurally the crown had set up a conflictive situation between the conquerors turned encomenderos and the high court determined to assert royal authority. The crown's choice of Nuño de Guzmán as president of the Audiencia was a major blunder. Guzmán largely ignored the crown's instructions and intentions to assert royal authority against the conqueror group and their rewards with Guzmán acting as a rival to accrue power and wealth to himself and his retinue via the power of the Audiencia. The crown rectified its blunder and dissolved the First Audiencia in 1530 and established the Second Audiencia with judges who recognized crown authority; this body functioned until the end of the colonial era.

In 1532, the Viceroyalty of New Spain was created, although the first Viceroy, Don Antonio de Mendoza, would not arrive in Mexico until 1535. The Viceroy took over the executive functions of government from the Audiencia and served as its president. In the following decade, as more mainland areas were conquered, a second Audiencia was created in Guadalajara, the provincial capital of the Kingdom of New Galicia, in 1548.

== Structure of the Audiencia ==
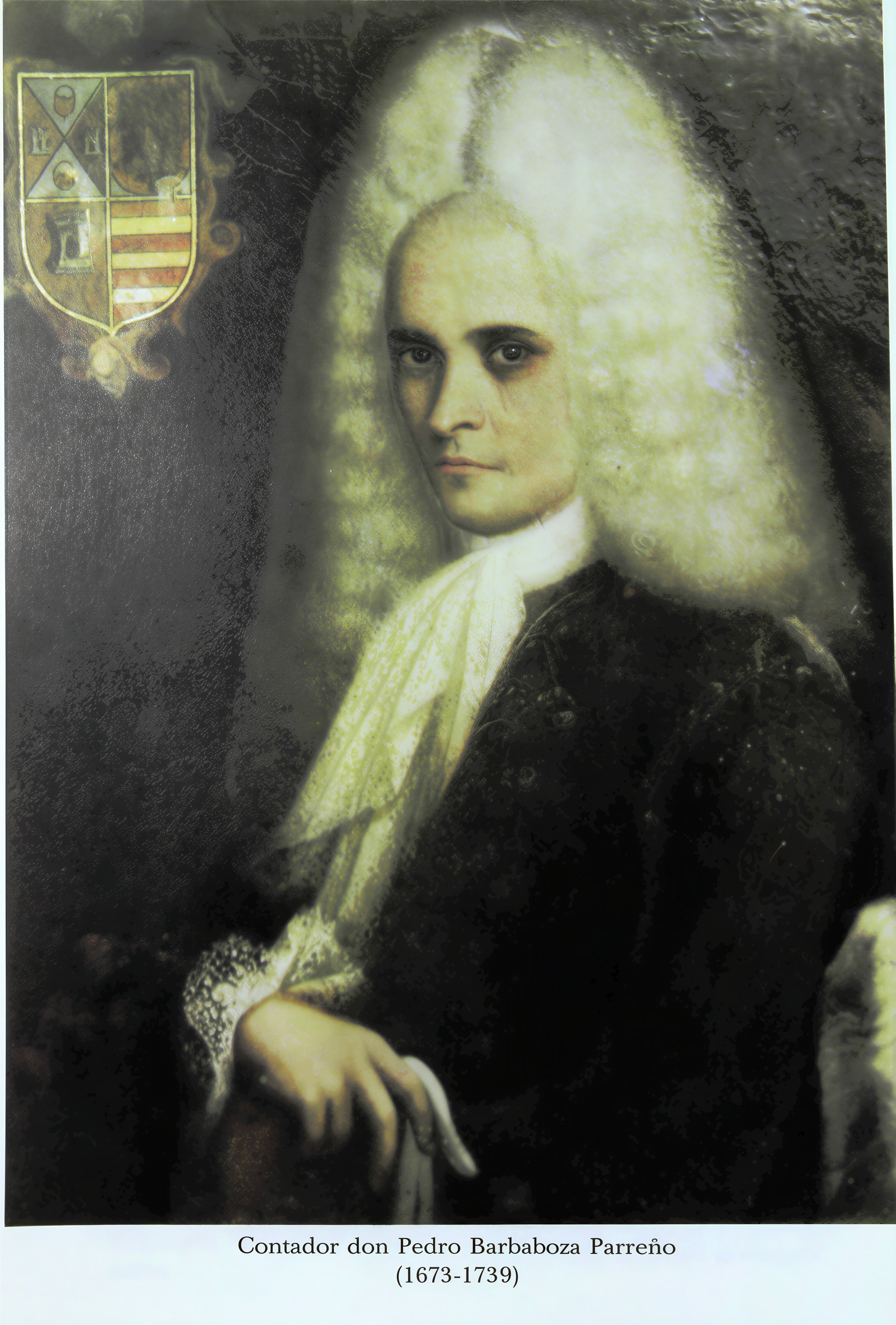
Pedro Barbaboza Parreño was granted the title of Contador Mayor of the Real Audiencia of Mexico on the 26th of june 1724.

Law III (Audiencia y Chancillería Real de México en la Nueva España) of Title XV (De las Audiencias y Chancillerias Reales de las Indias) of Book II of the Recopilación de Leyes de las Indias of 1680—which compiles the decrees of November 29, 1527; December 13, 1527; July 12, 1530; April 22, 1548, November 17, 1553; and January 19, 1560—describes the borders and functions of the Audiencia.

In the City of Mexico-Tenuxtitlan, capital of the Provinces of New Spain shall reside another Royal Audiencia and Chancellery of ours, with our viceroy-governor-captain general and our lieutenant, who shall be president; eight judges of civil cases [oidores]; four judges of criminal cases [alcaldes del crimen]; and two crown attorneys [fiscales], one civil and the other criminal; a bailiff [alguacil mayor]; a lieutenant of the Gran Chancellor; and the other necessary ministers and officials, which will have for district the provinces which are properly called of New Spain, with the ones of Yucatán, Cozumel and Tabasco; and by the coast of the North Sea and the Gulf of Mexico to the cape of Florida; and by the South Sea from where the district of the Audiencia of Guatemala ends to where that of the Audiencia of Galicia [Guadalajara] begins as demarcated by the laws in this title, dividing these among them by the east and west; with the North Sea and Province of Florida by the north and with the South Sea by the South.

Law XXXXVII, of the same book and title, is the Decree of Philip III of January 30, 1600, which mandated that when the office of viceroy was vacant, the Audiencia of Mexico became the acting viceroy, directly governing the provinces of New Spain and overseeing the area of the Audiencia of Guadalajara in administrative matters.

== See also ==
- Territorial evolution of Mexico
- History of New Spain
