= Teodoro de Croix =

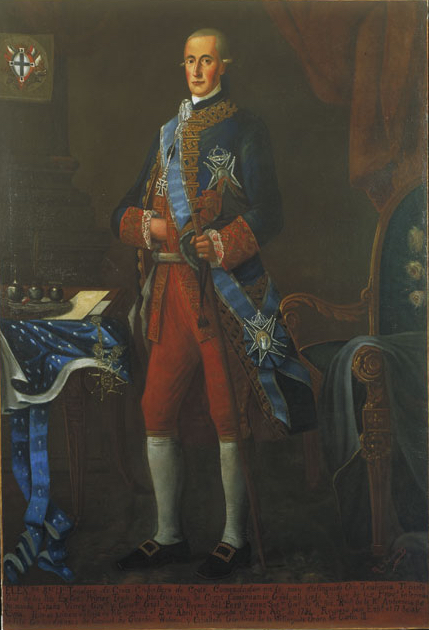

34th Viceroy of Peru
- In office April 29, 1784 – March 25, 1790
- Monarchs: Charles III; Charles IV
- First Secretary of State: Count of Floridablanca
- Secretary of State for the Indies: José de Gálvez; Count of Floridablanca (as interim)
- Preceded by: Agustín de Jáuregui
- Succeeded by: Francisco Gil de Taboada

1st Commandant-general of Provincias Internas
- In office May 16, 1776 – February 13, 1783
- Monarch: Charles III
- First Secretary of State: Jerónimo Grimaldi; Count of Floridablanca
- Secretary of State for the Indies: José de Gálvez
- Viceroy of New Spain: Antonio María de Bucareli; Francisco Romá y Rosell (as regent of Real Audiencia); Martín de Mayorga
- Preceded by: Office created
- Succeeded by: Felipe de Neve

Personal details
- Born: June 20, 1730 Prévoté Castle, near Lille, France
- Died: April 8, 1792 (aged 61) Madrid
- Parent(s): Maximilien-François de Croix (father); Isabelle-Claire-Eugène de Houchin (mother)

Military service
- Allegiance: Spain
- Branch/service: (Spain) Spanish Army
- Years of service: 1747–1792
- Rank: Lieutenant general
- Battles/wars: War of Austrian Succession: Italian campaign; Guerrilla warfare on the New Spanish frontier

Teodoro de Croix (June 20, 1730 in Prévoté Castle, near Lille, France – 1792 in Madrid) was a Spanish soldier and colonial official in New Spain and Peru. From April 6, 1784 to March 25, 1790 he was viceroy of Peru.

== Background ==
Teodoro de Croix was born in France, the third son of Alexandre-Maximilien-François de Croix, Marquis of Heuchin, and Isabelle-Claire-Eugène de Houchin. He entered the Spanish army at age 17 and was sent to Italy as an ensign of grenadiers of the Royal Guard. In 1750 he transferred to the Walloon Guards, bodyguards of the Bourbon kings of Spain. In 1756 he was promoted to lieutenant and was made a knight in the Teutonic Order. He became a colonel (still in the Walloon Guards) in 1760.

In 1766 he came to New Spain as a captain in the guard of Viceroy Carlos Francisco de Croix, marqués de Croix. He subsequently served as commandant of the fortress in Acapulco and as inspector of all troops in the viceroyalty. He served in this capacity until 1770. In 1771 the term of Viceroy Croix ended, and both Francisco and Teodoro returned to Spain. Visitador José de Gálvez returned with them.

== Provincias Internas del Norte ==
The Commandancy General of the Provincias Internas del Norte (Commandancy General of the Internal Provinces of the North) was established in New Spain in 1776, incorporating Nueva Vizcay, Santa Fe de Nuevo México, Nuevo León, Coahuila, Sonora y Sinaloa, Las Californias, and Spanish Texas. This arrangement was a response to numerous attacks by Apaches, Seris, Comanches, and other Indigenous tribes and to the fear of encroachment by other European powers. Headquarters was to be at Arizpe, Sonora.

On May 16, 1776, King Charles III of Spain named Brigadier Teodoro de Croix the first commandant general of the new jurisdiction. He replaced Hugo Oconór, an appointee of New Spain Viceroy Antonio María de Bucareli y Ursúa, in charge of Spanish forces on the northern frontier. He was independent of the viceroy of New Spain in most of this territory, but in Alta California the two were to share jurisdiction.

Croix assumed his office on January 1, 1777. He left Mexico City to inspect his new jurisdiction in August. He was responsible for military defense, civilian colonization and conversion of the Indians over the large, sparsely inhabited territory. Croix reported directly to the minister of the Indies, José de Gálvez. Critically for historians, he appointed Juan Agustín Morfi as chaplain of this expedition; Morfi went on to become the most important chronicler of the New Philippines; (Note: "se trata del principal historiador y cronista de la provincia de Nuevas Filipinas")

He built up the strongest military force across the northern frontier from Texas to Sonora than had ever been seen in the area, revamping the whole border defense in the process. On October 24, 1781, the king approved the separation of the Californias as a jurisdiction at the level of the Provincias Internas de Occidente.

== Viceroy of Peru ==
Croix was appointed lieutenant general and named viceroy of Peru on February 13, 1783. He relinquished command in the Provincias Internas del Norte to Felipe de Neve.

As viceroy of Peru, he decentralized the government through the creation of seven intendencias. He built the anatomical amphitheater and began the Botanical Garden of Lima. He adopted rigorous measures to suppress the thought of the Encyclopedists and revolutionaries in the United States and France. He improved the fortification of the coast and collaborated in the creation of the Junta Superior de Comercio and the Tribunal de Minería (1786).

As viceroy he sent naval officer José de Moraleda y Montero to draw new maps of Chiloé Archipelago and neighboring waters in northern Patagonia.

His term as viceroy ended in 1790 and he returned to Spain. In 1791 he was made a colonel in the king's bodyguard and a commander in the Teutonic Order. He died in Madrid the following year.

The people of Lima knew him as el Flamenco (The Fleming).

== Notes ==
Government offices
Preceded by Agustín de Jáuregui	Viceroy of Peru; 1784–1790	Succeeded by Francisco Gil de Taboada
