= Antonio María de Bucareli =

Viceroy of New Spain

The Most Excellent Antonio María de Bucareli y Ursúa
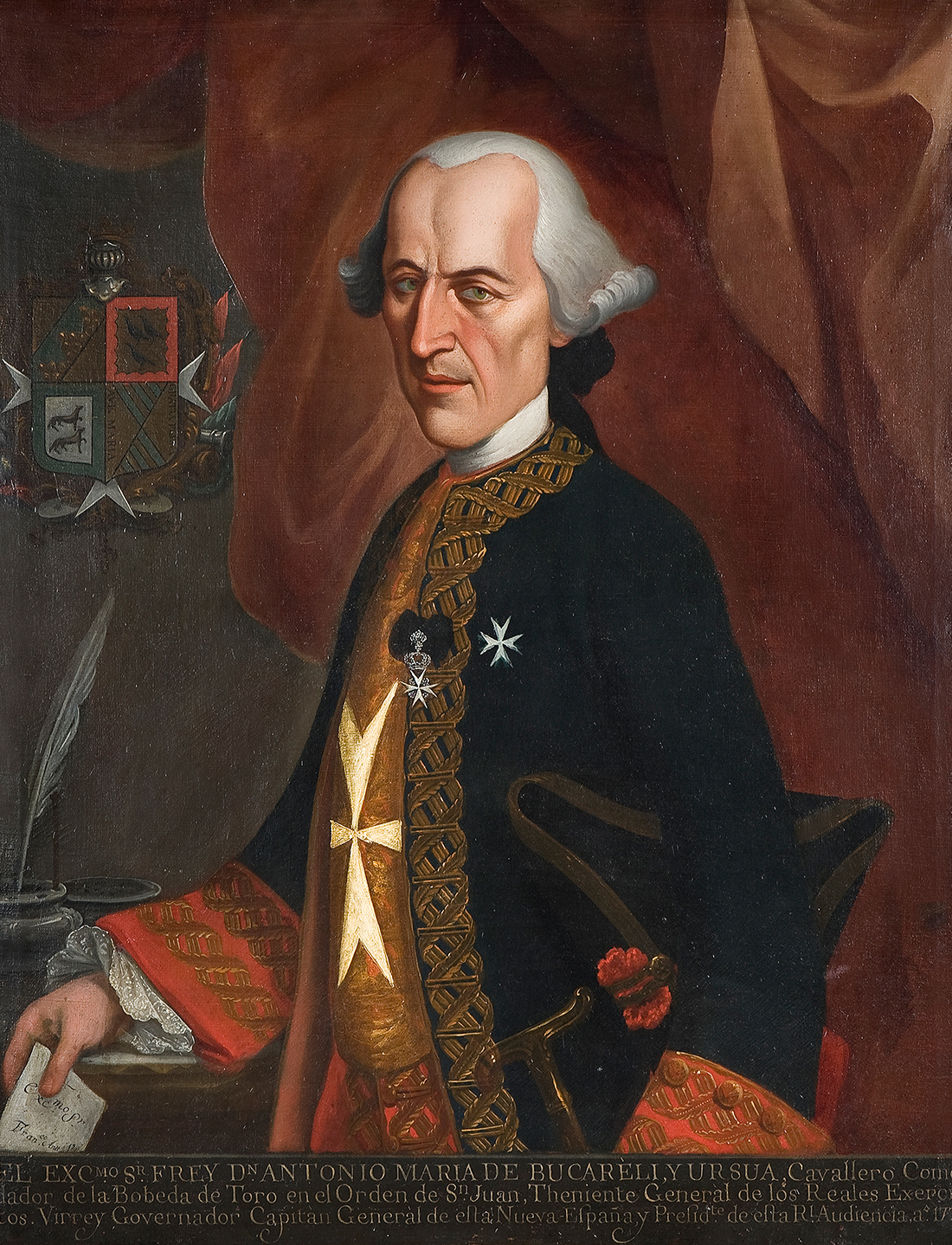
- Portrait by Francisco Antonio Vallejo, 1772

46th Viceroy of New Spain
- In office 23 September 1771 – 9 April 1779
- Monarch: Charles III
- First Secretary of State: Jerónimo Grimaldi; Count of Floridablanca
- Secretary of State for the Indies: Julián de Arriaga y Ribera; José de Gálvez
- Preceded by: The Marquis of Croix
- Succeeded by: Martín de Mayorga

61st Governor of Cuba
- In office 19 March 1766 – 14 August 1771
- Monarch: Charles III
- First Secretary of State: Jerónimo Grimaldi
- Secretary of State for the Indies: Julián de Arriaga y Ribera
- Viceroy of New Spain: Carlos Francisco de Croix; Himself
- Preceded by: Diego Manrique
- Succeeded by: Felipe de Fonsdeviela

Personal details
- Born: 24 January 1717 Seville, Spain
- Died: 9 April 1779 (aged 62) Mexico City, New Spain

Antonio María de Bucareli y Ursúa (24 January 1717 – 9 April 1779) was a Spanish military officer, governor of Cuba, and Viceroy of New Spain from 1771 until his death in 1779. His military service included campaigns in Italy and Portugal. He rose to the rank of lieutenant general while serving as inspector of coastal fortifications in Granada. In 1766, Bucareli entered the Spanish colonial administration as governor and captain general of Cuba. His record there earned him appointment as viceroy of New Spain in 1771.

Bucareli's accomplishments as viceroy included the pacifying of Indian revolts in the north, the elimination of bands of criminals that had roamed freely throughout the country, and the construction of forts at Acapulco, Perote, and Acordada. He also fostered projects to drain the Valley of Mexico, reformed the system of taxation, and promoted improvements in minting currency and in establishing fixed weights for coins. He encouraged the exploration and settlement of Alta California, authorizing the founding of Los Angeles, and dispatched a naval expedition to Alaska.

Bucareli has been recognized as one of the most effective eighteenth-century viceroys of New Spain. He was a capable and efficient administrator who made significant contributions to the expansion and development of New Spain.

== Beginning of his administration ==
Bucareli was born on 24 January 1717 to Luis de Bucareli, Marquess de Vallehermoso, and Ana María Ursua y Laso de la Vega, Countess of Gerena. He enlisted as a cadet in the brigade of Royal Carabineers, aged 15. After service in campaigns in Italy and Portugal, he was promoted to the rank of lieutenant-general while serving as inspector of coastal fortifications in Granada. In 1766 Bucareli entered the colonial administrative service of the Spanish Crown as governor and captain-general of Cuba.

His distinguished record in Cuba led him to be appointed Viceroy of the Viceroyalty of New Spain on 23 September 1771. He sailed from Havana on 14 August 1771, and arrived at Veracruz on August 23. He took command of the colony at San Cristóbal Ecatepec on 22 September, and made his formal entry into Mexico City on 23 September 1771. As Spain was at peace, he immediately reduced the size of the army to save costs. Before the reduction, the army consisted of 10,000 infantry and 6,000 cavalry, not including the regiment La Corona, the urban guard in Mexico City, Puebla and Veracruz, and the companies of Alvarado and Tlacotalpan. With the reduced army, he took special care to reinforce the presidios in the north, to fight the Apaches and Jumanos, who were continuing devastating incursions into Coahuila. The Indians taken prisoner were deported to Cuba, together with their families.

In 1771 he tried to reconcile the Franciscans and Dominicans in the colony, strongly divided over issues of the evangelization of California. The following year he prohibited the importation of foreign goods and recalled the circulating coins in order to replace them with others containing the likeness of King Charles III. He founded a military hospital in the old College of San Andrés. In 1776 he founded another hospital for the poor in Mexico City and on 20 January 1777, he inaugurated the hospital of San Hipólito, for the insane.

In 1772 Pedro Fages and Fray Juan Crespí, leaving from San Diego, founded the port and presidio of San Francisco, in Alta California. Bucareli sent two expeditions to lay stronger claims to the Pacific Northwest. Juan Josef Pérez Hernández was sent in 1774. Bruno de Heceta (or Hezeta) commanded the second expedition, with Juan Francisco de la Bodega y Quadra as second in command.

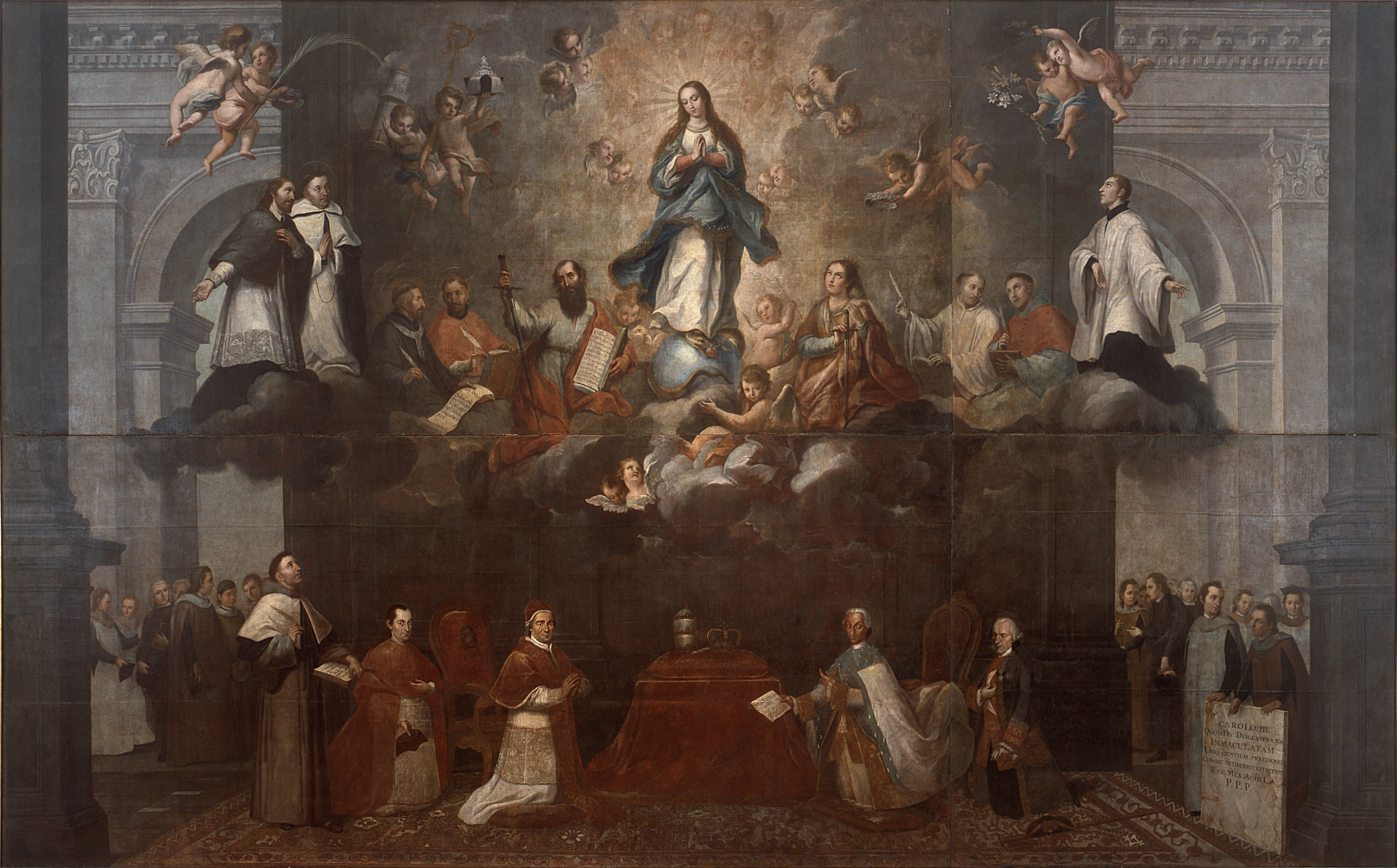
Representation of the two powers, church and state, by Francisco Antonio Vallejo. Bucareli can be seen to the right, kneeling behind Charles III

== Economic reforms ==
He convened a meeting of mineowners on May 3, 1774, which developed regulations to govern the industry. In July 1776, Bucareli granted them the right to form a trade association to manage the industry (the Mining Tribunal), and granted tax breaks to the mineowners, already very rich. One rich mineowner, Pedro Romero de Terreros, who had already lent 400,000 pesos to the previous viceroy, lent another 800,000 to Bucareli. Romero de Terreros also donated a ship of 80 guns to the navy. Baron Alexander von Humboldt asserted that Mexican miners were among the best paid in the world.

On 17 January 1774, the liberal government of Charles III established free trade between New Spain, Peru, and the recently created Viceroyalty of Nueva Granada. Bucareli had promoted this measure with the ministers of the government. He repaired Fort San Diego in Acapulco, to guard the port and the new commerce with South America. In 1779 free trade between Spain and the Indies took effect.

On 25 February 1775, he inaugurated the Monte de Piedad (government pawn shop, modeled on the one in Madrid) to give assistance to the poor.

== Judicial reforms ==
A royal decree of 11 March 1776, initiated what became known as the Great Judicial Reform of 1776 in the Indies. The Audiencia was a longstanding governmental institution in New Spain. The first Audiencia in the colony was named on 13 December 1527. Although it was a legal court, the highest in the colony, and although the oidores were judges, the body also exercised important legislative and sometimes executive powers in the government of New Spain.

However, supreme power within the colony was vested in the viceroy. Much power was concentrated in the viceroy's hands. One of his ex oficio positions had been president of the Audiencia, giving him important judicial powers along with his executive and legislative ones. The Crown had shown a strong preference for military men as viceroys, and those that did not have a military background generally had an ecclesiastical one. None were lawyers.

Under the reforms of 1776, the Audiencia become more independent of the viceroy. He was not longer presiding officer. That function was taken over by the newly created regent of the Audiencia. The new tribunal was intended as a check on the viceroy. Spain issued the document Instrucción de regentes (Instruction to Regents) on 20 June 1776. This contained 78 articles setting out detailed instructions and standards.

Some historians ascribe this reform to the influence of José de Gálvez, a royal inspector sent to the colony by Charles III in 1764. Gálvez traveled around the colony reporting on its administration and other aspects until 1772. He had unlimited authority, outranking even the viceroy.

== Later administration ==
It fell to Bucareli to finish the fort of San Carlos (1776), which Viceroy Carlos Francisco de Croix had begun. This fort was designed with new tactical ideas in mind, and located in the plain at Perote, Veracruz.

He suppressed many bandit gangs. In 1776 he tried to deal with a plague of locusts. He embellished the Alameda (Mexico City park). He promoted the drainage of the Valley of Mexico. In 1778 he planned the Mexico City street which today bears his name. On August 1, 1778, the Royal School of Surgery was founded.

On 12 February 1779, under orders from Bucareli, Princesa and La Favorita sailed from the port of San Blas, Nayarit to explore the Pacific coast to the north. This expedition explored as far as Alaska.

Viceroy Bucareli died in office 9 April 1779, of an attack of pleurisy. He was interred, among expressions of grief from the public, in the cemetery adjacent to the church of Guadalupe. He left various writings, including Allosgusstio ad Patres Concilii IV, Provincialis Mexicani, die X Octobris ann. 1771, Reglamento para el cuerpo de militares inválidos de la Nueva España, and Collección de todas las providencias de su gobierno. He was succeeded on an interim basis by Francisco Romá y Rosell, president of the Audiencia.

An able administrator, he improved the public treasury, commerce, and the monetary system. Mexican historians consider him one of the most outstanding viceroys.

Bucareli Sound, in Alaska, and Avenida Bucareli, in Mexico City, are named after him.
