= Patronato real =

Royal patronage in the Spanish Empire

The patronato (lit. 'patronage') system in Spain (and a similar padroado system in Portugal) was the expression of royal patronage controlling major appointments of Church officials and the management of Church revenues, under terms of concordats with the Holy See. The resulting structure of royal power and ecclesiastical privileges, was formative in the Spanish Empire. It resulted in a characteristic constant intermingling of trade, politics, and religion. The papacy granted the power of patronage to the monarchs of Spain and Portugal to appoint clerics because the monarchs "were willing to subsidize missionary activities in newly conquered and discovered territories."

== Patronato real in Spain and its overseas possessions ==
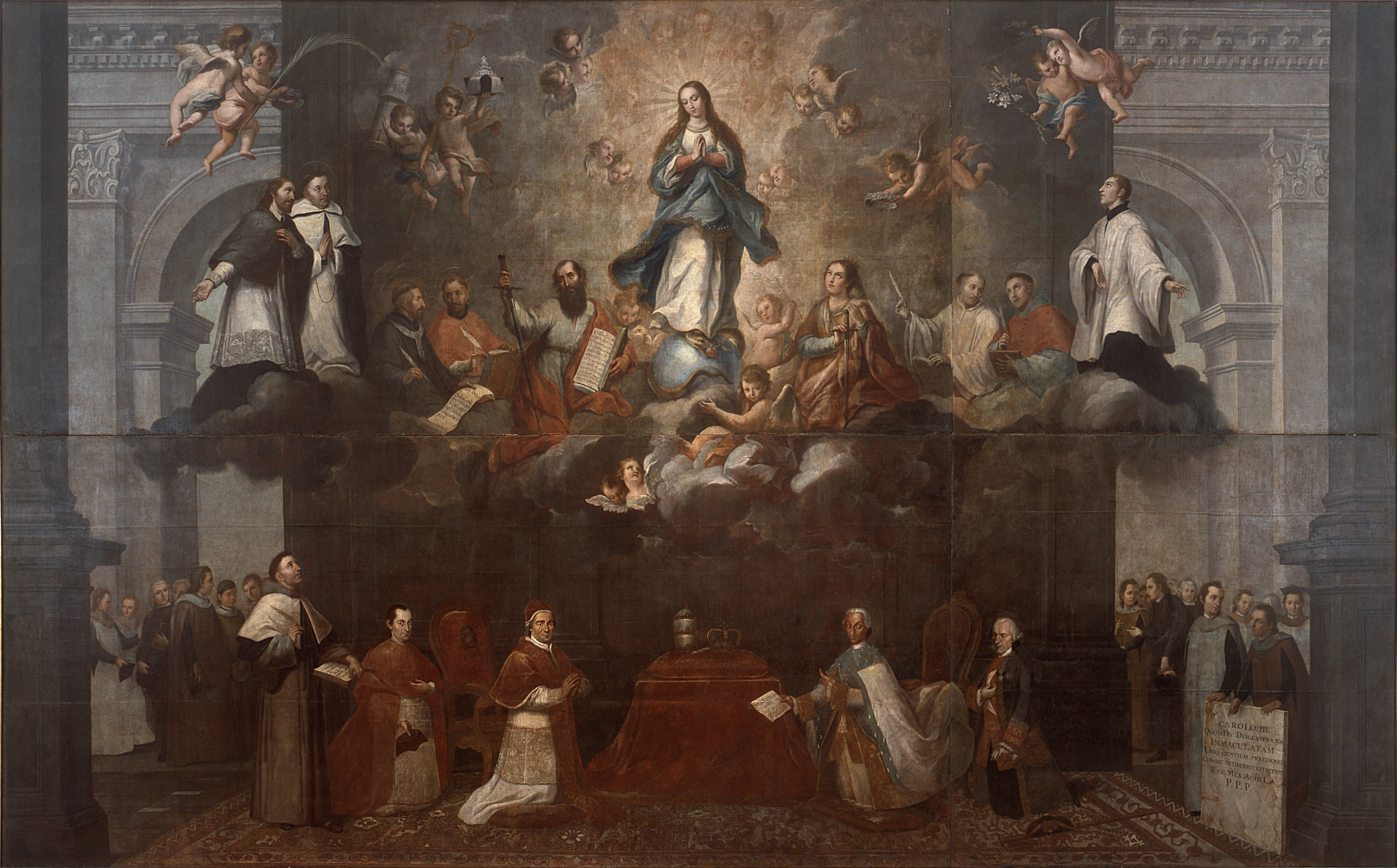
"Glorification of the Immaculate Conception" by Francisco Antonio Vallejo, National Museum of Art (Mexico), representing the two powers of church and state, symbolized by King Carlos III of Spain and Pope Clement XIV, respectively attended by the Viceroy of New Spain and the Archbishop of Mexico, honoring the Blessed Virgin Mary.

The patronato was a prerogative granted by a competent ecclesiastical authority endowing a person with the permission to take over the obligations of providing for the administration and maintenance of a religious benefice. The patronato real has its foundation in canon law, which recognized the right of laymen to establish and patronize churches and missions, as a means to supplement the efforts of the papacy, the Church, and the religious orders. Such laypersons were recognized as patrons and possessed certain rights and privileges over the churches and missions they established, financed and patronized.

In the case of the kings of Spain, they received rights over New World ecclesial appointments and affairs in exchange for their support of evangelization and the establishment of the Catholic Church in America. It was derived from the papal bulls Romanus Pontifex (1455) and Inter caetera (1493), granted for the benefit of Portugal on its Atlantic routes, and the so-called Alexandrian Bulls issued in 1493, immediately after the voyage of Christopher Columbus at the request of the Catholic Monarchs. The royal or Indian patronage for the Spanish Crown was confirmed by Pope Julius II in 1508. Religious teaching to the Indians was benefited by the bishoprics.

Earlier, on December 13, 1486, Pope Innocent VIII had granted the queen of Castile and her husband, the king of Aragon, at their request, the perpetual patronage of the Canary Islands and Puerto Real including also Granada, foreseeing their next conquest. This was stipulated with the bull Ortodoxae fidei. However, it was not until 1505 that the monarchs asked the pope for the full prerogatives of the patronage in the discovered areas and in the Spanish territory under his rule. And only in 1523, Pope Adrian VI granted them.

== Development ==
These royal powers were: the sending and selection of the missionaries to America (Bull Inter caetera, 1493), collection of the tithe (bull Eximiae devotionis, 1501), power to fix and modify the boundaries of the dioceses in America (bull Ullius fulcite praesidio, 1504) and power to veto the election of archbishoprics or bishoprics, as well as the right of presentation (bull Universalis ecclesiae, 1508). In 1539 the Holy Roman Emperor Charles V demanded that the bishops' petitions to the Holy See pass through his hand, imposing the royal pass (regal pass or regium exequatur) on the pontifical documents to be executed.

The royal certificate of patronage in the Indies (real patronato indiano) that consolidated the institution was issued. In it, under royal authorization, the construction of churches, cathedrals, convents, hospitals, the concession of bishoprics, archbishoprics, dignities, benefits and other ecclesiastical positions. The prelates had to give account to the king of their acts. For the provision of parishes, the bishop was to call a contest and the selected candidates, to submit two to the civil authority for it to decide. In addition, the dispensation of the visit ad limina apostolorum of the bishops to the Holy See was obtained; the correspondence of the bishops was submitted to the revision of the Council of the Indies; the provincial councils were to be held under the supervision of viceroys and presidents of the royal audiences; to erect convents or religious houses a report should be sent to the king on foundations, haciendas and number of religious in the region and wait for the royal approval; no regular superior could exercise his office without obtaining the real authorization; vigilance was ordered to the convent life, punishing the ecclesiastics who did not fulfill their duties. The Real Hearing is constituted in court for, in the first instance, to settle ecclesiastical conflicts. Finally, some religious orders, such as the Franciscans, were given the figure of the Apostolic Vicar for America, which limited the power of the superior general.

The royal patronage allowed the Church to count on numerous missionaries, had the necessary economic and financial resources and, above all, facilitated their mobilization and distribution. However, it also had other consequences less favorable to the papal perspective, such as the submission of the Church to royal assent

Institutions such as the encomienda and debates such as that of the just titles make clear what was the true importance of religious justification for colonial rule. The control of the Hispanic monarchy over the Church, not only in America, but in the peninsula (presentation of bishops, bull of Crusade, control over the military orders and the Inquisition) caused envy in other European monarchies that are not alien to movements like the Reformation or, in Catholic France, Gallicanism or regalism; to which the Papal Counter-Reformation responded, among other movements, with the institution of Propaganda Fide (1622).

== Eighteenth century ==
In the 18th century, with Spain and the Indies under the Bourbon dynasty, regalist ideas were added to the Spanish regalist tradition (Chumacero and Pimentel, in the 17th century, Macanaz in the first half of the 18th century). In 1735 the Board of the Royal Board that had Gaspar de Molina y Oviedo as president proclaimed that the kings of Spain were entitled to the universal patronage that implied the assumption of all the benefits of the kingdom. On these bases, in the context of the endless discussions for the Concordat of 1753, the Spanish–Portuguese border conflicts over the territory of Misiones and the suppression of the Society of Jesus from Spain and Spanish overseas territories (1767); Spanish jurists developed a tendency to express royal control over the Church through new doctrinal formulations, which implied that both the patronato and the submission of the Church to the State did not derive from a concession of the Holy See, but was the result of an inherent right to the sovereignty of kings. The concordat endorsed this idea even though 52 benefits were reserved.

== Nineteenth century ==
In the successor states to the Spanish and Portuguese colonial empires, the conservative establishment of the Church and ruling class continued to be referred to as the patronato.

== Current era ==
The new concordat, signed in 1851, maintained the universal patronage that remained the right of the Spanish Crown until the advent of the Second Spanish Republic (1931). The patronato real was reestablished by the Concordat of 1953 granting it to Spanish dictator Francisco Franco until a new convention finally abolished it in 1976 during Spain's transition to democracy.

This doctrine, maintained in Spain, was also invoked by the newly formed American republics after the wars of Spanish–American independence (1808–1821). The new American states wanted to maintain the right of patronage, considering themselves as continuators of the historical and legal obligations of the Spanish crown, on the Catholic Church within their territories. The royal patronage was maintained until the Church–State separation at the beginning of the 20th century.

== See also ==
- Advowson
- Jus patronatus
