= Francisco Romá y Rosell =

Spanish Royal officer

Francisco Romá y Rosell (b. Mataró, Spain, died 1784) was a Spanish royal official in Valladolid and New Spain. He was the first regent of the Real Audiencia of Mexico. In this capacity, after the death of Viceroy Antonio María de Bucareli y Ursúa and before the arrival of his successor, Martín de Mayorga, Romá served as interim governor of the colony from April 9, 1779 to August 23, 1779.

== Early career and writings ==
Romá y Rosell received a doctorate in laws in Huesca. He practiced as a lawyer in Barcelona, and then entered the royal civil service. Over a long career he served in Catalonia, Castile and New Spain.

He was a member of the Royal Academy of Experimental Physics and Agriculture of Barcelona. In 1766 he edited Disertación histórico-político-legal para los Colegios y Gremios de la Ciudad de Barcelona (Historical-Political-Legal Dissertation for the Associations and Professions of Barcelona), in which he attempted to show the benefits of the professions for the improvement of public order, the laudable customs of the artisans, and the quality of manufactures in the city. In 1768 he published Señales de la felicidad de España y medios de hacerlos eficaces (Signs of the Happiness of Spain and Means to Make It More Effective). In this latter work he argued that the development of agriculture, industry and commerce was needed to move Spain out of its current state of decadence. In a passage later quoted by other authors, he said:

People no longer try to buy sturdy, heavy clothes that can be passed on to their great-grandchildren. No long does anyone say, "I wore out two pairs of sleeves on this coat". Everyone is pleased to wear light clothes, whose low price allows them the satisfaction of following the fashion, which changes every year. (1768 edition, pp. 160-161).

Also in this book he argued for the expropriation of unused land.

In 1769 he was named alcalde de hijosdalgo in the Chancellery of Valladolid. In 1771 he was promoted to the criminal chamber of the court, and just four years after that he became an oidor (civil judge).

== As first regent of the Audiencia of Mexico ==
The Audiencia was a longstanding governmental institution in New Spain. (The first audiencia in the colony was created on December 13, 1527 and the second, on February 13, 1548.) In addition to functioning as a court of last resort, the Audiencia oidores also exercised important legislative and executive powers in the government of New Spain. In turn, the viceroy in one of his ex oficio positions served as the president of the Audiencia. This gave him important judicial powers along with his executive and legislative ones. (The viceroy could only set the agenda of the court. Only if a viceroy was a trained lawyer could he rule on cases before the audiencia.) The Crown had shown a strong preference for military men as viceroys, and those that did not have a military background generally had an ecclesiastical one. None were lawyers.

A royal decree of March 11, 1776 initiated what became known as the Great Judicial Reform of 1776 in the Indies. Under these reforms, the Audiencia become more independent of the viceroy. He was no longer the presiding officer. That function was taken over by the newly created regent of the Audiencia. Romá y Rosell became the first regent of the Audiencia of Mexico.

== As interim governor of New Spain ==
Soon after his arrival in Mexico City, he worked on a project for the cultivation of flax and hemp, apparently at the request of the Minister of the Indies, José de Gálvez. But shortly after his arrival, he was thrust into a position of greater responsibility by the death of Viceroy Bucareli. Romá y Rosell served as interim governor of the colony from early April to late August 1779.

Twelve days before he turned over the office to Martín de Mayorga, news was received in Mexico City of Spain's declaration of war against Britain. It fell to Romá y Rosell to begin the preparations to put New Spain on a war footing. The new viceroy, when he arrived, approved his actions.

== Later career ==
Romá y Rosell had been chosen by José de Gálvez, secretary of the Council of the Indies, for two important tasks. The first was the introduction of the judicial reforms, and the second was to stimulate the economy of the colony. However, he was inexperienced in colonial administration, and did not maintain close contact with Gálvez. He was replaced in 1782 by Vicente Herrera. Romá died in 1784.

== See also ==
- List of Viceroys of New Spain
