= Carlos Francisco de Croix, 1st Marquess of Croix =

Mexican politician (1699–1786)

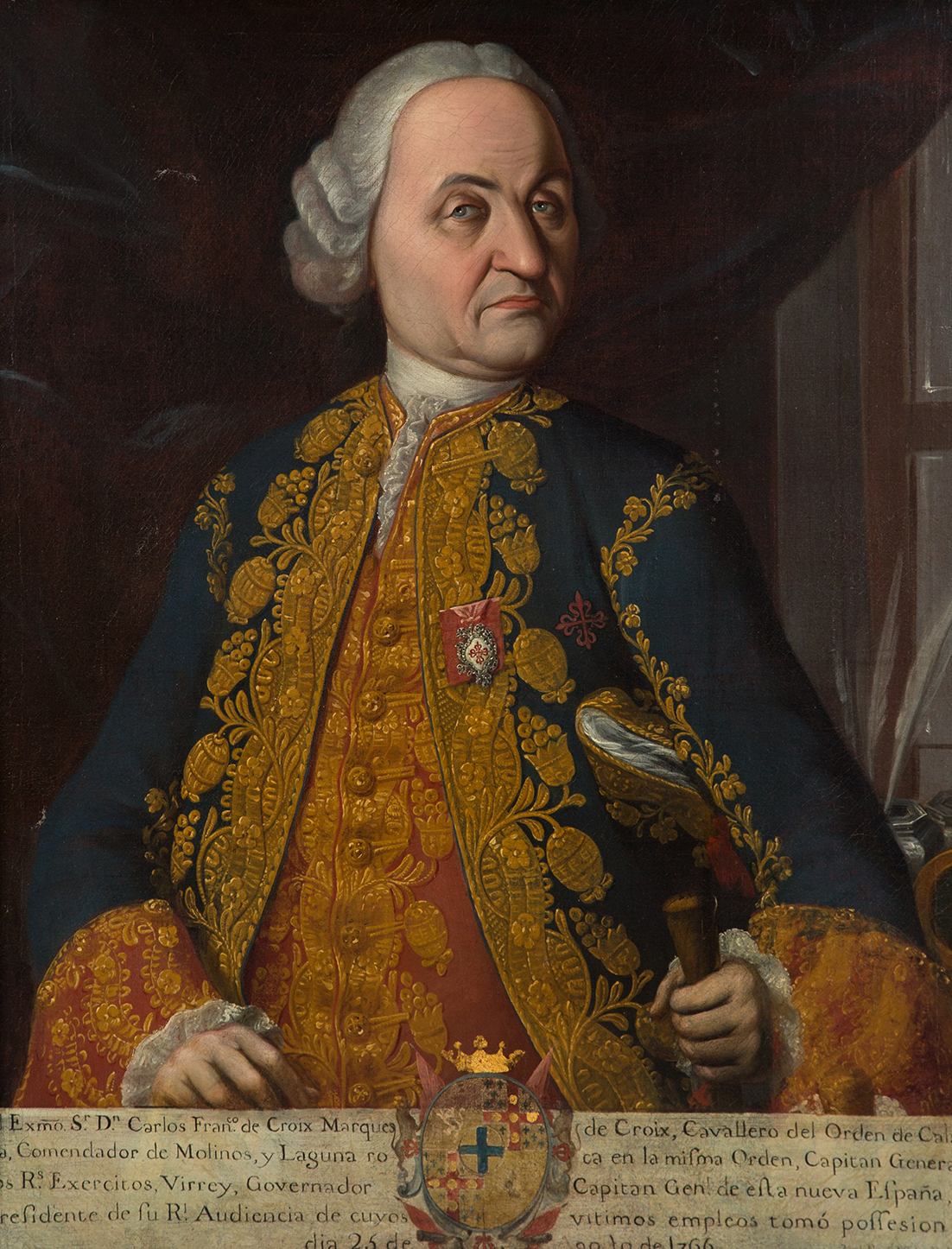
Carlos Francisco de Croix, marqués de Croix, Viceroy of New Spain.

Carlos Francisco de Croix, 1st Marquess of Croix (1699 in Lille, Flanders – 1786 in Valencia, Spain), was a Spanish general and viceroy of New Spain, from August 25, 1766, to September 22, 1771, a period of considerable turbulence.

== Military career and arrival in New Spain ==
Carlos Francisco de Croix served in the Spanish army, where he rose to the rank of general. He was commandant of the garrison in Ceuta, one of the Spanish possessions in Africa, and later captain general of Galicia. He was serving in Galicia at the time of his appointment to the viceroyalty of New Spain.

In 1766, he succeeded Joaquín de Montserrat as viceroy of New Spain, making him the first foreign-born viceroy of Spain. He arrived in Veracruz on July 10, 1766. The transfer of power occurred at Otumba, en route to Mexico City, on August 23, 1766, but his term of office is usually dated from his formal entry into Mexico City two days later. His nephew, Teodoro de Croix, future Commandant General of the Provincias Internas and Viceroy of Peru, arrived in his retinue as Captain of the Viceroy's Guard.

The sole principle of his administration was absolute obedience to the king, whom he always referred to as "mi amo".

== Expulsion of the Jesuits ==
It fell to Croix to expel the Jesuits from the colony (June 25, 1767) and confiscate their properties. In this he was aided by the visitador (inspector general), José de Gálvez. Troops were used to remove the Jesuits from their monasteries and colleges; they were allowed to leave with scarcely the clothes on their backs. They were escorted to Veracruz and deported to Italy. Among the Jesuits expelled were Fathers Andrés Cavo, Francisco Javier Clavijero and Francisco Javier Alegre, distinguished scholars. The College of San Ildefonso was closed.

These measures provoked a rebellion, especially in the cities of Guanajuato, Pátzcuaro, Valladolid and Uruapan. The viceroy and the visitador dealt severely with the rebels, hanging the leaders. In ordering the expulsion, the viceroy divulged the royal disposition in a message that ended with these eloquent words:

"... once and for the future, the subjects of the great monarch who occupies the throne of Spain, should know that they were born to be silent and obey and not to discusse, nor to comment on the high affairs of the government."

At this time the conflicts between Criollos and Peninsulares were first noted. (Criollos were Europeans born in New Spain, and Peninsulares were Europeans born in Iberia.) The disturbances at the time of the expulsion of the Jesuits led to some murders of Peninsulares and to the destruction of images of the king. Viceroy de Croix was aware of this, and included information about it in a secret report to King Charles III.

The king, in addition to expelling the Jesuits, also gave his support and protection to the Inquisition.

The secular clergy and the remaining regular clergy, fearing possible royal action against them, began to speak against the regime in sermons and other public acts. The viceroy took this seriously enough that he warned of punishments for those religious who got mixed up in affairs of government. His censorship reached the level of suppressing the Diario Literario, published by José Antonio de Alzate y Ramírez, even though it contained only literary and scientific articles (May 15, 1768).

== Later events in his administration ==
The Pima and Seri Indians had resumed their revolt, and the viceroy sent an expeditionary column to Sonora to suppress it (April 14, 1767). Visitador Gálvez joined this expedition in order to get to know that part of the colony. Gálvez also traveled to Baja California and Alta California, in order to establish defenses against Russian encroachment from the north.

On March 17, 1768, the college of surgery was established by royal order in the Royal Hospital in Mexico City. The first director was Manuel Moreno, rector of the College of Cádiz.

Josefa Ortiz de Domínguez, heroine of Mexican independence, was born September 8, 1768, in Valladolid (Morelia).

De Croix received the troops sent from Spain to defend the colony against potential British attacks. The infantry regiments of Saboya, Flanders and Ultonia arrived at Veracruz June 18, 1768, and those of Zamora, Guadalajara, Castile and Granada arrived later. In total, these included 10,000 men. Because of their white uniforms, these troops were known as blanquillos. The officers of the Zamora regiment organized the militias.

The Apaches and Comanches were defeated in Nueva Vizcaya by militia under the command of Captain Bernardo de Gálvez. There were disturbances in the mines of Guanajuato and Pachuca, over the low wages paid to miners. One alcalde mayor was killed at Pachuca. De Croix got the mine-owners to agree to an increase in wages.

De Croix established the lottery in 1769, which brought considerable income to the treasury. In 1770 he increased efforts to teach Spanish to the Indians, with the construction of special schools for this purpose. He constructed the castle of San Carlos in Perote, Veracruz, in honor of the king. This was intended as a point of resistance in the event of a hostile landing on the coast.

He doubled the area of the Alameda in Mexico City, and closed the autos-da-fé of the Inquisition to the public. In 1771 he opened the fourth Council of Mexico of the Roman Catholic clergy. It concluded October 26, 1771, but its deliberations did not receive the approval of the pope or the Council of the Indies, and they never took effect.

He asked that the salary of the viceroy be increased from 40,000 to 60,000 pesos annually, and this request was granted. He introduced to New Spain French fashions and French cuisine.

On May 18, 1771, the Spanish government reduced the silver content in coins to 7.12%.

He turned over his office to Antonio María de Bucareli y Ursúa on September 2, 1771, and returned to Spain. Upon his return to Spain, King Charles III named him captain general of Valencia, where he died a few years later.
