= Francisco Antonio Vallejo =

Mexican muralist

Francisco Antonio Vallejo (1722–1785) was a Mexican muralist. He worked over 30 years. His main work is located in the La Enseñanza Church in Mexico City; the chapel sacristy of the School of Saint Ildefonso; and the series of the Life of Saint Elías in the Convent of Carmen in Saint Luis Potosí.

His work belongs to the last period of the Mexican baroque, and integrates histrionic resources and brands his artistic personality with the colors in his palette, especially diverse shades of blue, which turned into an identifier of the pictures that came out of his workshop.

He was a teacher at the Academy of San Carlos, and belonged to the group of the Academy of Painting in 1754.

== Work ==
- Glorificación de la Inmaculada (Glorification of the Spotless), 1774. Preserved restored at Pinacoteca Virreinal.
- Escudo de monja (Nun's Shield)
- Sagrado corazón de Jesús (Sacred Heart of Jesus), 1780
- Virgen de Guadalupe (Virgin of Guadalupe), 1781
- Inmaculada Concepción (Spotless conception)
- Vida de San Elías (Life of St. Elías). Convent of Carmen
