= José de Gálvez, 1st Marquess of Sonora =

Spanish lawyer and Visitador general

The Most Excellent José de Gálvez
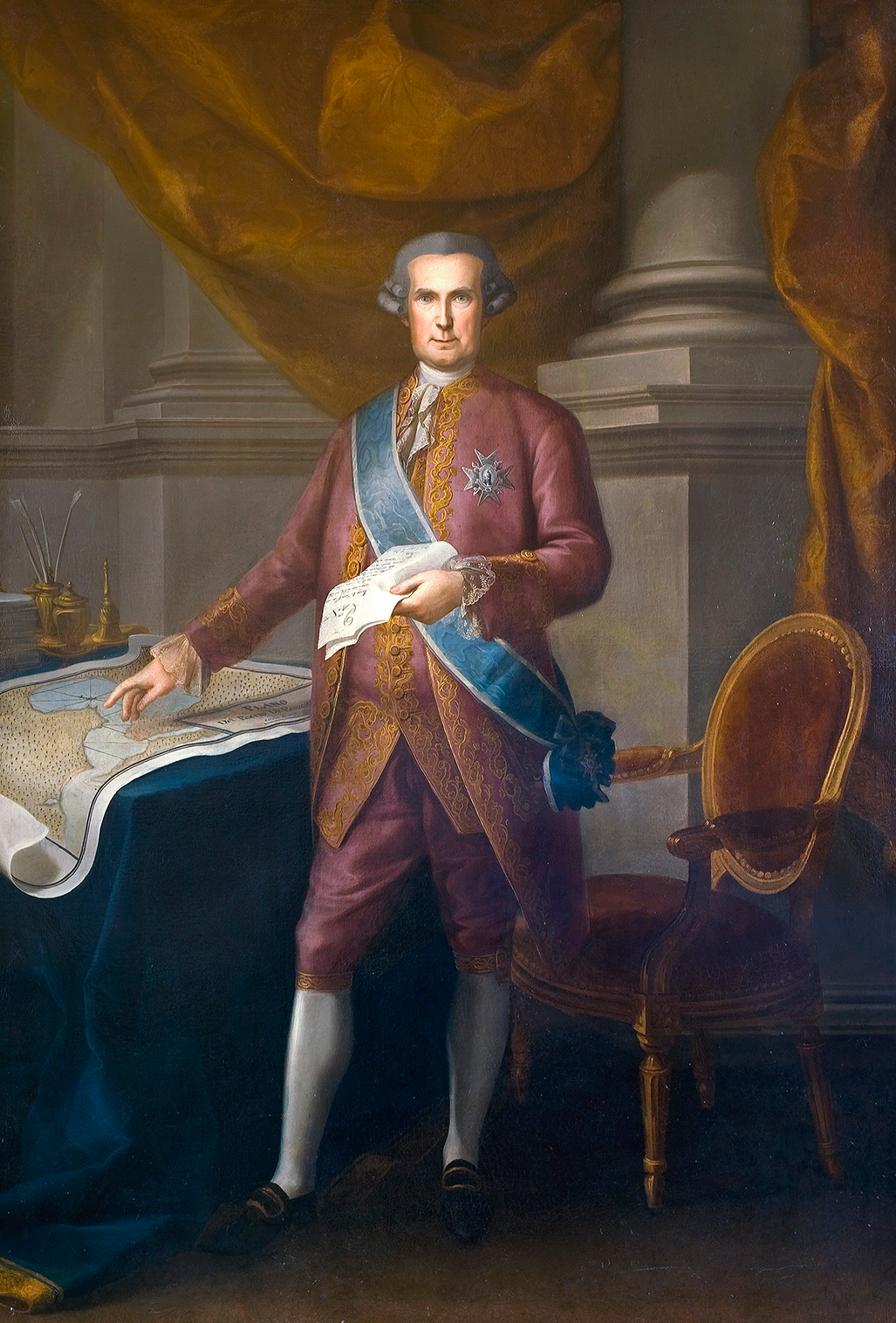
- Portrait of Gálvez, 1785

Secretary of State for Indies of Spain
- In office 28 January 1776 – 17 June 1787
- Monarch: Charles III
- First Secretary of State: Jerónimo Grimaldi; Count of Floridablanca
- Preceded by: Julian de Arriaga y Ribera
- Succeeded by: Count of Floridablanca (interim)

President of the Council of Indies
- In office 1775–1787
- Monarch: Charles III
- Preceded by: Juan Pizarro de Aragón
- Succeeded by: José Moñino y Redondo

Visitor-general of New Spain
- In office 1764–1772
- Monarch: Charles III

Personal details
- Born: 2 January 1720 Macharaviaya, Kingdom of Spain
- Died: 17 June 1787 (aged 67) Aranjuez, Kingdom of Spain

José de Gálvez y Gallardo, 1st Marquess of Sonora (2 January 1720, Macharaviaya, Spain – 17 June 1787, Aranjuez, Spain) was a Spanish lawyer and Visitador general (inspector general) in New Spain (1764–1772); later appointed to the Council of the Indies (1775–1787). He was one of the prime figures behind the Bourbon Reforms. He belonged to an important political family that included his brother Matías de Gálvez and nephew Bernardo de Gálvez.

== Early career ==
Following the death of his noble but impoverished father, Gálvez became a shepherd, then studied at an elite Catholic seminary in Málaga. After he realized he was not cut out for a priestly vocation, the local bishop sent him to study law at Salamanca. He received his law degree at the University of Alcalá.

Practicing law in Madrid, he handled many legal cases involving the Indies. He gained the attention of powerful people in Madrid, including the marqués de Equilache and the marqués de Grimaldi, ministers of Charles III. Gálvez married María Magdalena de Grimaldo, who died a year later. He then married Lucía Romet y Pichelín, an elite woman of French origin, well connected at the royal court. Lucía's connections enabled Gálvez to work as legal adviser at the French embassy in Madrid. Climbing the social and political ladder, he secured a job as personal secretary to Jerónimo Grimaldi, minister to the newly ascended king Carlos III. In 1762, Gálvez secured a position as attorney to prince Carlos, the future king Carlos IV. In 1765, he was appointed visitador (inspector) of New Spain, where he both gathered information and implemented royal policy to increase crown revenues.

== Visitador (inspector general) in New Spain ==
In 1765 at the age of 45, Gálvez arrived in New Spain, which included all of Spanish North America. As visitador del virreinato de Nueva España (inspector general for the Viceroyalty of New Spain) he exercised sweeping powers; the most in Spanish North America. The visitador served as the king's special deputy, with special powers overlapping and sometimes exceeding those of the viceroy. Gálvez was given the task of reforming the finances of New Spain to increase its revenues for the crown — part of the energetic attempts to reorganize King Carlos III's government after the costly Seven Years' War, which had in 1762 seen the British capture both Havana, Spain's main Caribbean port, and Manila, Spain's governmental and commercial center in the Philippines and also resulted in Spain ceding Florida to Britain.

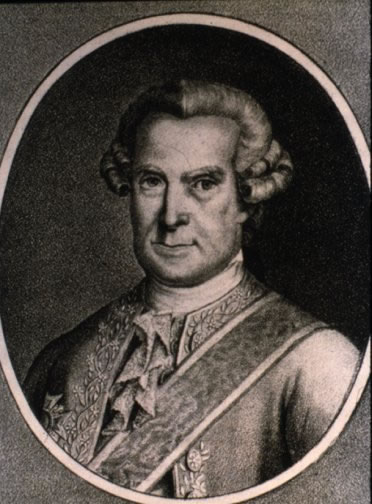
Engraving of Gálvez

As visitador, Gálvez instituted quick and decisive changes in tax collection, accounting, and jailed corrupt officials. He created a state monopoly of tobacco and imposed new taxes on pulque and flour. He also took measures to combat contraband and reformed the system of customs collection in Veracruz and Acapulco. (He ended the farming of customs.) He also established general accounting offices in the municipal governments. Government revenues rose from 6 million pesos in 1763 to 8 million in 1767 and 12 million in 1773. In 1765 Gálvez assisted in reorganizing the army, a project of viceroy Joaquín de Montserrat, marqués de Cruillas under the direction of general Juan de Villalva. When Cuillas opposed Gálvez's actions, he was soon replaced by a new viceroy, Carlos Francisco de Croix. Gálvez privileged peninsular-born Spanish merchants over American born, which had the effect of funneling capital into mining. He boosted the mining industry further by reducing the price of mercury, a crown monopoly, which allowed a greater volume of silver ore to be refined.

In 1767, Spain's king Carlos III decreed expulsion for the Jesuits throughout his empire. In Mexico, this decree led to riots and other disturbances. Gálvez suppressed these by summary trials and sentences of life imprisonment, mainly in San Luis Potosí, Guanajuato and parts of Michoacán.

=== Management of Baja California missions ===
With the expulsion of the Jesuits from the Baja California peninsula, Gálvez engaged the Franciscan Order to take over the spiritual affairs of the missions there. Even after the arrival of Junípero Serra and his fellow Franciscan friars, the Spanish military — having evicted the Jesuits from the missions they had established — continued running the missions' practical business. In 1768, Gálvez toured the Baja chain of missions. Angered over the sloppy administration he found there, he reprimanded the soldier commissioners stationed at the missions. In August, he signed a decree turning all of Baja's missions — except mission Loreto — over fully to the Franciscan friars. He banned card-playing and gambling at mission settlements. Overruling the Franciscans' appeal for clemency for miscreant soldiers, Gálvez punished most of them by assigning them to the upcoming expedition to Alta California — and discharged the rest from military service.

Continuing to manage Baja California affairs into 1769, Gálvez sought to balance scarce natural and human resources in the fragile chain of missions: Some missions lacked enough land and water to sustain all their Indian converts; other missions, endowed with ample land and water, lacked enough workers to cultivate their fields. Gálvez ordered Indians moved from one mission to another — despite the Indians' reluctance to leave their home villages — to correct such imbalances. He also had some young Indian orphans sent to Loreto for training in handling coastal boats and ships. Gálvez worked with the Franciscan president of the Baja missions, Junípero Serra, in his projects to improve the lives of the natives, whom he called "the poor Israelites." Yet he insisted that Baja Indians pay the royal tax, standing by his order despite Serra's efforts to persuade him that collecting such a tax would prove impractical.

=== Plan to expand into upper California ===
Ambitious to reinvigorate the imperial fortunes of New Spain, Gálvez proposed consolidating and developing the far northwest under a huge governmental unit to embrace the regions of Sinaloa, Sonora, Chihuahua, and the Californias — including claimed but unsettled upper (Alta) California. Playing on long-standing fears in Spain's ruling circles that rival powers would muscle in on territories Spain claimed along the Pacific coast, Gálvez spread rumors of schemes by the British and Dutch rulers to add California to their own empires. Then, when a report arrived from the Spanish ambassador in Russia that Catherine the Great planned to establish settlements down the California coast towards Monterey, Gálvez trumpeted the Russian threat. King Carlos gave the go-ahead, and Gálvez prepared a series of expeditions of soldiers, sailors, artisans, Christian Indians and missionaries to push north into unexplored upper California. In 1768, Gálvez sailed from San Blas to Loreto to finish planning the coming year's expeditions.

To free the Franciscan missionaries from their posts in Baja California, Gálvez called upon friars of the Dominican Order to take charge of the Baja missions. Gálvez assigned Junípero Serra to head the missionary team in the Alta California expedition — without bothering to ask padre Serra if he agreed to his new mission. As it turned out, Serra, eager to pioneer in evangelizing Indians in Alta California, readily joined in. Gálvez established a naval base at San Blas and, in 1768–9, organized sea and land expeditions up the California coast to the projected Spanish outpost at the harbor named Monterrey (originally spelled with a double "r") by Sebastián Vizcaíno in 1603. Gaspar de Portolá, governor of Las Californias, commanded the second overland expedition. Closely attending to the logistical details of the expeditions, Gálvez issued thorough instructions to the key officers and technicians. He ordered Miguel Costansó, the young engineer and cartographer, to make observations of the ports of San Diego and Monterey, compare his findings with the older sailing charts, draw new maps, and examine the countryside around both ports. Gálvez issued further instructions for building a proper fortification at Monterey; reconnoitering the ports of Monterey and San Francisco; and preparing detailed accounts destined for top officials in Mexico and Spain.

=== Expeditions from Baja to Alta California ===
On January 9, 1769, Gálvez, padre Serra and town dwellers gathered on the shore of La Paz to bless and send off the San Carlos, the expedition's flagship captained by Vicente Vila, a native of Andalusia. The hastily built galleon San Carlos, along with the two ships to follow — the San Antonio and San José — had arrived from San Blas leaking, requiring repairs at La Paz bay. Gálvez personally superintended the repairs and loading of the San Carlos, carrying some of the mission furniture aboard with his own hands. In his speech on the shore, Gálvez proclaimed that the ship's crew, including Franciscan friar Fernando Parrón, had the mission of planting the holy cross among the Indians at Monterey. In the name of king Carlos and viceroy Carlos Francisco de Croix, Gálvez urged the explorers to keep peace among themselves and respect their chaplain, padre Parrón. When the San Carlos set sail, Gálvez followed in a launch to see the ship round Cabo San Lucas.

On February 15, Gálvez dispatched the San Antonio, the second ship of the sea expedition, from Cabo San Lucas. Captain Juan Pérez, a native of Palma de Majorca, commanded the San Antonio. Franciscan friars Juan Vizcaíno and Francisco Gómez served as chaplains. The third ship, the San José, disappeared at sea on the way to San Diego.

While Gaspar de Portolá prepared his overland expedition to San Diego, Gálvez issued him strict instructions:

...To prevent difficulties and disaster in the outcome, the most prudent supervision must be exercised. Therefore, I charge you with zeal and vigilance to maintain the most exact discipline over the soldiers of the expedition as well as over the muleteers, especially from the frontier on, so that the Indians will be well treated. The soldiers are to be punished as in the case of an irremissible crime if they offer any affront or violence to the women because, besides being offenses against God, such excesses committed by them could also bring disaster to the entire expedition.

Gálvez then cautioned Portolá to travel slowly, to reduce the chances of Indian resistance. He wanted the expedition members to demonstrate to the Indians the advantages they would gain by living under the sovereign protection of the Spanish king.

The commander of the first overland expedition, Fernando Rivera y Moncada, was waiting at Velicatá, 350 miles south of San Diego. Gálvez had ordered captain Rivera to requisition horses and mules from local Baja California missions without endangering their survival, giving the missionaries receipts for the exact number of animals taken. Those missions would later get restocked with animals shipped from Mexico across the Gulf of California. Franciscan friar Juan Crespí, chosen as chaplain and diarist for the Rivera party, left his post at Mission La Purísima to join Rivera at Velicatá. On March 24, 1769, Rivera, Crespí, 25 leather-jacketed soldiers, 42 Baja Christian Indians, and 3 muleteers began their journey, driving a large herd of cattle, horses and mules. They arrived in San Diego on May 14, where the San Carlos and San Antonio awaited them.

Meanwhile, the second overland party, headed by Portolá, gathered in Loreto, around 900 miles south of San Diego — with instructions to follow the Rivera party to San Diego. The Portolá expedition included Franciscan missionaries headed by Junípero Serra. The expedition founded Mission San Diego de Alcalá and the Royal Presidio of San Diego in July 1769 in San Diego. Portolá then continued north to explore the Alta California coast and re-establish the port of Monterey visited in 1602 by Sebastián Vizcaíno.

In November 1769, the Portolá expedition discovered San Francisco Bay before returning to San Diego. A second trip in 1770 led to the establishment of the Presidio of Monterey and Mission San Carlos Borromeo de Carmelo (Mission Carmel). Although Gálvez — in arguing for his plan to expand into San Diego and Monterey — had projected that Alta California would eventually prove a great source of revenue for the Spanish crown, the region wound up running an annual deficit during most of its years under Spanish rule.

=== Gálvez's personal imprint on California history ===
Historians James Rawls and Walton Bean call Gálvez the most effective visitador (inspector general) in the history of New Spain. They attribute Spain's expansion into Alta California to his intense personal ambitions. "…Although he was a brilliant, forceful, and generally successful administrator," write Rawls and Bean, "he was also unusually vain, selfish, ruthless, deceitful and unstable. It was, indeed, because of Gálvez's possession of this very combination of qualities that the occupation of San Diego and Monterey, long considered and periodically given up as hopeless, actually materialized."

=== End of the Visita ===
Gálvez returned to Spain in 1771. In 1769 he collapsed mentally and physically, attributed to overwork and the conflict with the indigenous in Sonora; although he recovered, "the end of the visita was clouded." He returned to take up his position on the Council of the Indies to which he had been appointed in 1767.

== Bourbon Reforms in Spanish America ==
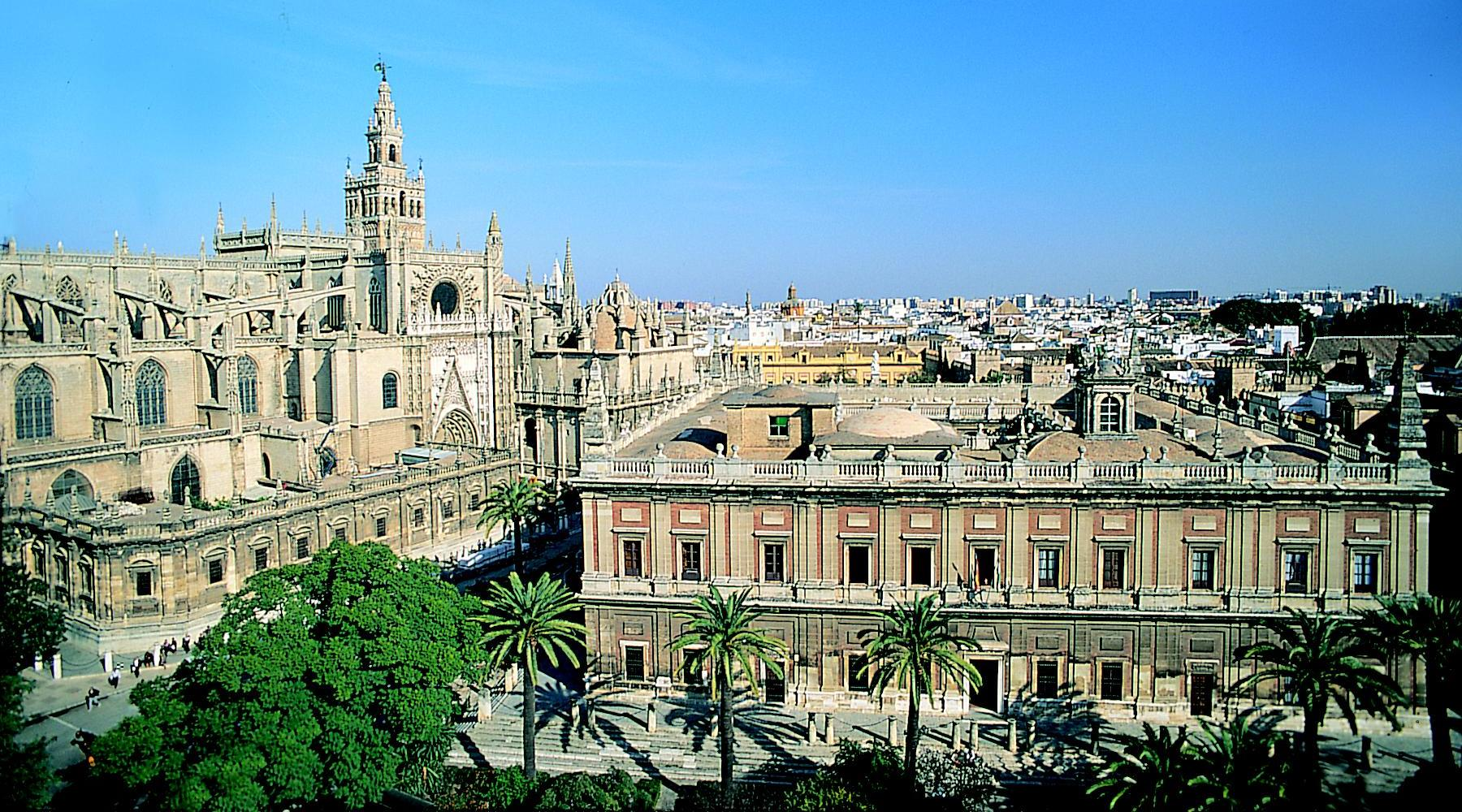
Archive of the Indies in Seville, founded by Gálvez in the reign of Charles III

José de Gálvez returned to Spain in 1772, where he was a member of the General Council on Commerce, Coinage and Mining, a governor in the Council of the Indies, and a councilor of state. Instead he was authorized to set up a Commandancy General of the Provincias Internas, which was to be independent of the viceroy of New Spain. The new political unit included the Provincias Internas of Nueva Vizcaya, Nuevo Santander, Sonora y Sinaloa, Las Californias, Coahuila y Tejas (Coahuila and Texas), and Nuevo México. Chihuahua was the capital, and Teodoro de Croix, nephew of the former viceroy, was named the first Commandant General.

=== Establishments ===
Gálvez's zeal to more effectively organize the overseas administration led him to also establish the Viceroyalty of Rio de la Plata (1776) from territories of the Viceroyalty of Peru, and the Captaincy General of Venezuela (1777) from parts of the Viceroyalty of New Granada. He also created the Captaincy General of Venezuela in order to promote the population and economy of the area; For this purpose, in 1776 he named his fellow Malaga native Luis de Unzaga for his diplomatic skills, Unzaga, known as "le Conciliateur" the next time he will leave his nephew, Bernardo de Gálvez as interim governor From Spanish Louisiana, replacing Unzaga, that same year he became brothers-in-law, when Bernardo married the little sister of Unzaga's wife; In this way, Minister José de Gálvez appointed Luis de Unzaga as the first Captain General of Venezuela in 1777 by bringing together various territories and creating a defense plan there that would also help achieve the birth of the United States. Both these new governments were intended to expand areas of settlement and stimulate the economy. He also established the Real Compañía de Filipinas and in 1778 founded the Archivo General de Indias, bringing together documents about the Indies from Simancas, Seville and Cádiz. Also in 1778 he established limited free trade among the colonies. As Minister of the Indies he was able to secure the appointment of his brother Matías as governor-captain general of Guatemala. Matías went on to serve as viceroy of New Spain.

=== Túpac Amaru rebellion ===
In 1780, during the Túpac Amaru rebellion, Minister José de Gálvez harshly exiled Fernando Vélaz de Medrano, 4th Marquess of Tabuérniga, a nobleman, military leader, and aristocrat, for informing the Prince of Asturias (the future Charles IV of Spain) about the rebellion and widespread corruption among royal officials in South America, particularly regarding the playing card and tobacco monopolies imposed by José de Gálvez, which were seen as a catalyst for the unrest.

When in 1781 the Túpac Amaru rebellion broke out in Peru and the Comunero Revolt in New Granada (Colombia), Gálvez unleashed ruthless repression.

=== American Revolution ===
In 1780, he sent a royal dispatch to Teodoro de Croix, Commandant General of the Internal Provinces of New Spain, asking all subjects to donate money to help the American Revolution. Millions of pesos were given. In 1784 he established a uniform excise tax on the importation of African slaves into the Indies.

Gálvez was wary of the possibility of Spain's own overseas territories being inspired by the American Revolution into trying to secede, so he favored a proposal from politician José Ábalos to turn the Spanish Empire into multiple kingdoms under rulers of the same royal house, hoping to deflect any ideas of independence, but this scheme was never realized.

=== Immigration ===
As representative of the King of Spain, José de Gálvez signed the Cedula de Poblacion of 1783 opening the island of Trinidad to immigration from, primarily, the French Caribbean islands. Negotiated by Phillipe Rose Roume de Saint-Laurant, the edict consists of 28 articles governing various forms of land grants to encourage population growth, the naturalization of inhabitants, taxation, the arming of slave owners, the duty and function of a militia to protect the island, and trade and mercantile issues.

=== Intendencia ===
In 1786 he undertook another major reorganizing of the Spanish American administration with the introduction of the intendencia (intendancy) administered by an Intendente (Intendant) throughout most of the Americas.

== Legacy ==
Gálvez was a heavy-handed administrator, implementing major reforms in Spanish America to strengthen royal power, promote efficiency, diminish the role of American-born elites, and increase revenues. One assessment of Gálvez is that "his legacy of a more rational administration was purchased with the political alienation of many Americans and not a few Spaniards, whom he pushed from their traditional places and powers."
