= Santiago Canyon, California =

Unincorporated community in California, United States

Santiago Canyon
- Unincorporated community
- Location within California
- Coordinates: 33°45′35″N 117°42′09″W
- Country: United States
- State: California
- County: Orange
- Elevation: 1,370 ft (420 m)
- Time zone: UTC-8
  - Summer (DST): UTC-7
- ZIP: 92676
- Area code: 949

Santiago Canyon is a canyon and unincorporated community in eastern Orange County, California, United States. According to the 2000 census, Santiago Canyon has several hundred residents living within its borders. Trabuco Canyon, Silverado Canyon, Modjeska and Williams Canyon are tributaries of Santiago Canyon. Santiago Creek flows northwest from the canyon, then west into the Santa Ana River. Neighborhoods in Santiago Canyon include Santiago Canyon Estates and Falcon View Estates. The landmark Cook's Corner motorcycle restaurant is also located within Santiago Canyon.

The ZIP Code is 92676, and the community is served by area code 949.

== History ==
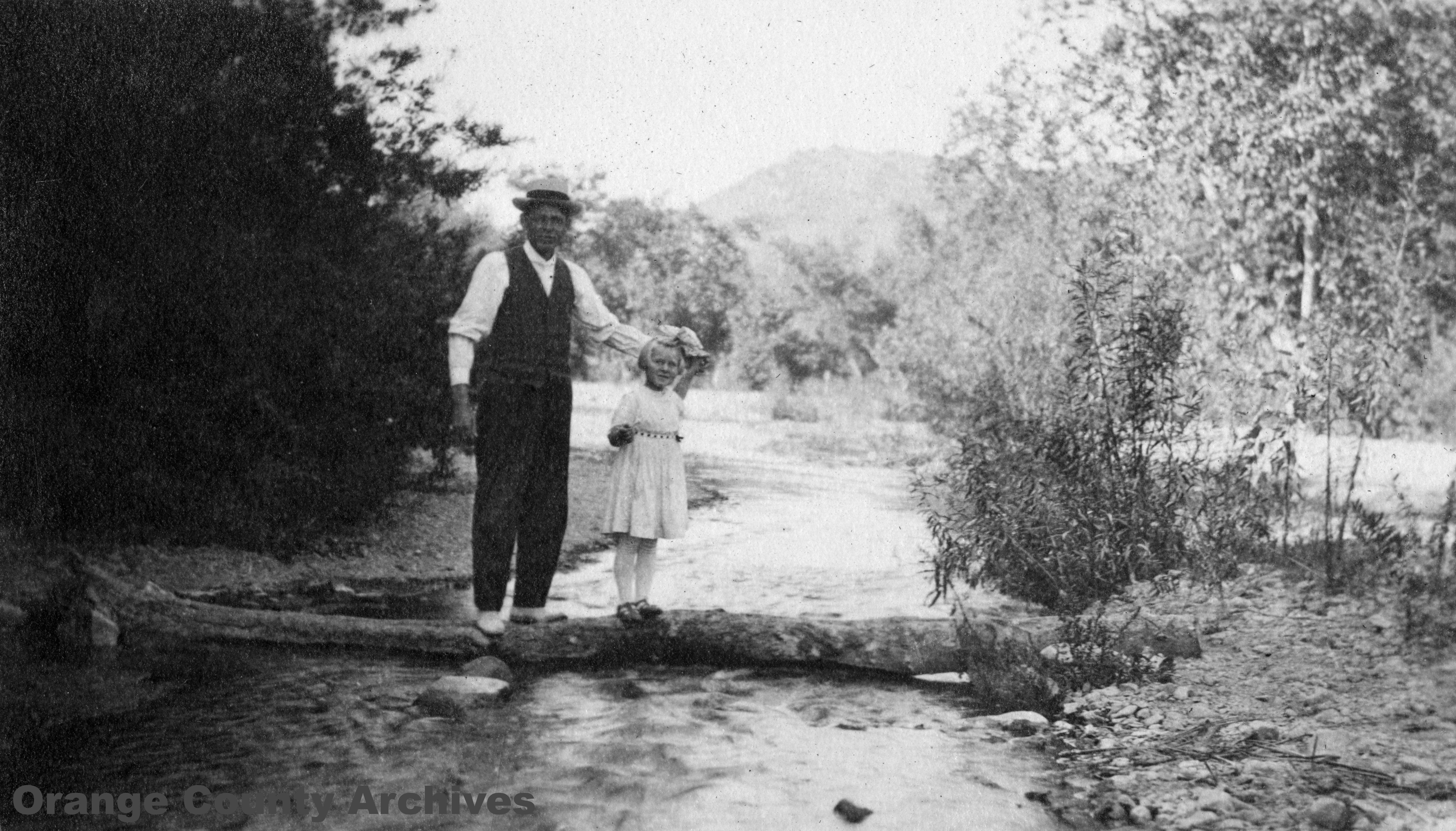
Fourth Crossing, Santiago Canyon trail, 1918

Within the canyons, there are excellent examples of exfoliation, in which rock layers peel back like layers of an onion, and of frost wedging, in which ice trapped in a crack expands to split a rock. Fossils of millions of clams, snails, and small-shelled, squid-like creatures left behind during the five times that seas washed over the ground can be found.

Appearing more than 12 million years ago, the highest points surrounding the canyons are Santiago Peak at 5,689 feet (1,734 m) and Modjeska Peak at 5,481 feet (1,671 m). Together the pair forms "Old Saddleback," an easily recognizable landmark.

The first people to live in the canyons were Native Americans (the Acjachemem). They arrived to find dense woods filled with live oaks, sycamores, mountain ash, and pines buffeted by winds. Dependent on acorns and less-plentiful pine nuts as their staple foods, the Native Americans cut paths through the riparian vegetation to reach oak and pine groves. After collecting the acorns, they carried them to canyon streams and immersed the nuts in the running water to leach out the bitter tannic acid. Once done, they carried the acorns to a large boulder or rock outcropping, where they used mortars to grind the nuts into powder. Over open fires, they cooked a porridge called "atole."

The first European land exploration of Alta California, the Spanish Portolà expedition, skirted the southern edge of the Santiago Hills, crossing Santiago Creek before reaching the Santa Ana River. On its way north, the party camped in the area on July 26–27, 1769. The return journey to San Diego retraced its steps through the area, stopping on January 19, 1770. Franciscan missionary Juan Crespi noted in his diary entry for July 27: "It [the creek] comes down from the mountains, and shows that it must have plenty of water in the rainy season. It was given the name of the holy apostle and patron of the Spains, Santiago."

The Santiago Fire, one of the major California wildfires of October 2007

Santiago Canyon was home to one of the major California wildfires of October 2007. The "Santiago Fire" endangered the Santiago Canyon Estates, as well as Falcon View Estates and nearby Modjeska Canyon, Trabuco Canyon, and other areas. All homeowners in those communities were placed under mandatory evacuation, with the roads Plano Trabuco and Live Oak Canyon being temporarily closed for the use of emergency personnel. The fire was ignited on October 21, 2007, and was attributed to arsonists. It has burned over 27,000 acres (110 km^{2}), and the cost of rebuilding is estimated to be $5.5 million.

== Recreation ==
Hiking and mountain biking are the two common forms of recreation in Santiago Canyon, due to the area's mountainous terrain. Some popular trails include the Modjeska Trail and Live Oak Canyon Trail, both available for hiking and mountain biking. Santiago Canyon's signature recreation trail is the Santiago Truck Trail, ideal for hiking, running, and mountain biking. The Santiago Truck Trail stretches 8 miles (13 km), to the trail end, "Old Camp". Bird watching is also a prominent activity in the canyon; native birds in the area include the turkey vulture, red tailed hawk, and bald eagle, all of which can be seen in the Tucker Wildlife Sanctuary in neighboring Modjeska Canyon as well. Motorcyclists and bicyclists are common sights in Santiago Canyon. The California historic landmark site Cooks Corner restaurant is a favorite among motorcyclists.
