= Miguel Constansó =

Miguel Constansó (1741–1814), original name Miquel Constançó, was a Catalan engineer, cartographer and cosmographer. He joined the Portolá expedition of Alta California led by Gaspar de Portolá and Junípero Serra, serving aboard ship as cartographer and on land as engineer.

== Biography ==
Constansó was born in Barcelona in 1741. After serving in the Spanish infantry in coastal Catalonia and Granada, he entered the corps of military engineers in 1762 with the rank of second lieutenant. In August 1764, along with six other military engineers, Constansó voyaged from Spain to Veracruz, Mexico (New Spain), where they formed a brigade. From 1764 to 1767, Costansó mapped the coast of the Gulf of Mexico from his base in Veracruz. Upon his own petition, he was selected to travel to Sonora as engineer for the expedition headed by brigadier Domingo Elizondo to suppress Indian rebels. He served about a year in that campaign, charting battle plans and taking topographic measurements used in later maps.

Summoned from Sonora by New Spain's visitador (inspector general) José de Gálvez, Constansó traveled south to San Blas in 1768 for a meeting to plan the upcoming Spanish land and sea expeditions to Alta California. Aiming to develop San Blas as a permanent settlement and supply base for the chain of Spanish presidios and Catholic missions projected for Alta California, Gálvez assigned Constansó to complete a set of maps and drawings of San Blas, for submission to viceroy Carlos Francisco de Croix in Mexico City.

Gálvez and Constansó then sailed across the Sea of Cortés to Baja California, landing in rundown mission fields vacated by recently expelled Jesuit priests. Gálvez sent Costansó to the area north of Cabo (cape) San Lucas, where he made scale drawings and plans of the cape, Bahía (bay) de La Paz, and Isla Cerralvo.

=== Voyage from Baja California to San Diego ===
Joining the expedition headed by Gaspar de Portolá to expand Spanish rule into Alta California, Constansó consulted with New Spain's visitador (inspector general) José de Gálvez about the details of the sea and land expeditions from Baja California. On January 9, 1769 in La Paz, Constansó boarded the Spanish "paquebote" (a snow) San Carlos as cartographer and engineer. Also on board were captain Vicente Vila, Franciscan friar Fernando Parrón, lieutenant Pedro Fages, surgeon Pedro Prat, and 25 soldiers under Fages' command along with a crew of sailors.

=== Observations of Kumeyaay Indians ===
Upon recovering from the ill effects of the voyage, Constansó set about fulfilling the instructions of José de Gálvez: Along with Pedro Fages, he reconnoitered the port and inland areas of San Diego. In his letter reporting to Gálvez, Constansó called the local Kumeyaay Indians "docile but inclined toward robbery and thievery; they covet everything and fall in love with anything as soon as they see it. They are lazy idlers and not very industrious. I have seen no other evidence of dexterity but their nets, which they weave very well from a thread that looks like hemp, but it is of ixtle fiber which they get from a very small species of maguey… These nets serve as a belt and, at the same time, as an instrument with which to fish and hunt. In the woods they catch birds and little rabbits with them. They also make purses or very large sacks woven of rather fine net.

"The men are entirely naked. The women cover their private parts with double nets cinched at the waist and reaching to the middle of their thighs. At times they also use a kind of little cape made of strips of fur interlaced and twisted. All randomly stain and paint themselves of various colors, among which…they prefer that of red and ochre. Some use lead-colored black and they look hideous. These are people of little ambition and they recognize our superiority in weapons and in all the rest…"

"There are no thick tree trunks in this land with which they can make canoes," Constansó continued, "but they supplement the lack of these with balsa rafts made from cattails whose reeds are tied together with ixtle fiber. With these they maneuver and can enter the estuaries and beaches of the port to spearfish or fish. They use a short double-bladed paddle and row with the greatest agility from one side to the other. Each raft cannot hold more than one man, who sits in the middle over a little stack of hay with legs crossed. They always get their buttocks wet, but it does not matter much to them."

Constansó and Fages explored a canyon, along with friars Juan Crespí and Juan Vizcaíno and six soldiers, to see how far it cut inland. Along the way, they found an Indian village consisting of around 75 families. "These people received us with a thousand demonstrations of happiness and joy," wrote Constansó, "because they recognized us and had visited us on various occasions. They told us by signs that they would look for rabbits and hares for us to eat, with the understanding that we would give them ñipas, which is what they call our clothes. They later went into the woods and, in less than three hours, brought us a substantial amount of game that we took in exchange for cloth."

=== Portolá expedition up the California coast ===
On July 14, 1769, Constansó set out from San Diego with a party of 74 men on the Portolá expedition to locate Monterey Bay. The party included lieutenant Pedro Fages with his Catalonian volunteers; captain Fernando Rivera; leather-jacketed soldiers; Christian Indians from Baja California; and friars Juan Crespí and Francisco Gómez. The party failed to find Monterey Bay. According to governor/commander Portolá, Costansó — as well as Fages and Rivera — urged him to search farther north for Monterey. Costansó's tenacity enabled him to reach San Francisco Bay, which he became the first person to map professionally.

Along the way, Constansó observed plants, animals and the local astronomy, recording his findings in his diary; he also noted details about the Indians' customs. His reports of the expedition were later published widely, including translations into English and German. On January 24, 1770, the 74 hungry and exhausted men of the Portolá expedition — including Cosntansó — returned to San Diego, to a warm welcome from their fellow soldiers and friars.

=== Voyage to Monterey ===
On April 16, 1770, Constansó — along with friar Junípero Serra and ship captain Juan Pérez — boarded the galleon San Antonio in San Diego Bay and set sail for Monterey. The next day, Portolá led a new overland party out of San Diego also bound for Monterey, where they aimed to establish a mission and presidio. The San Antonio got buffeted by unfavorable ocean winds that blew it back south to Baja California, then as far north as the Farallon Islands, 100 miles (160 km) northwest of Monterey. Several sailors fell sick with scurvy. The San Antonio finally sailed into Monterey Bay on May 31, welcomed by the Portolá party which had arrived one week before.

=== Return to Mexico ===
On July 9, 1770 Constansó, along with Portolá, boarded the San Antonio in Monterey Bay to sail to Mexico. There he reported to viceroy De Croix and inspector general Gálvez on the successful occupation of Alta California by the Portolá expedition parties.

In 1772, the new viceroy Bucareli received a petition from Juan Bautista de Anza for permission to open a route from Sonora to Alta California. Bucareli consulted Constansó on the feasibility of such an overland route, which aimed to facilitate the migration of colonists — including women — to the new Spanish outposts in coastal California. Accurately estimating the straight-line distance between Tubac and San Diego, Constansó judged the route feasible, despite mountainous terrain along the way. King Carlos III approved the plan, and De Anza set out from Tubac on his first exploratory trek in 1774.

Following prevailing military regulations, Costansó petitioned for permission to marry in 1776. A little over a year later, his superiors granted his request to marry Manuela de Aso y Otal, a woman from a wealthy family in Mexico.

==== Design and construction projects in Mexico ====
Once settled back in Mexico, Constansó worked as an engineer in the service of New Spain for over 40 years. He took charge of the construction of the Hospital General de San Andrés. In 1772 he launched a project to construct a new building for the Real Casa de Moneda (royal currency house or mint), a project that occupied him for eight years. At a time when Spanish rulers felt their empire threatened by British naval power, Constansó helped shore up New Spain's (Mexico's) military defenses. He surveyed and reported on major damage done to the Fort of San Diego at Acapulco Bay by a 1776 earthquake. His pentagonal design for a new fort got approved in 1777 and slightly modified in the subsequent rebuilding of the fort, which served as the main defense of Mexico's Pacific coast. By order of viceroy Mayorga in 1779, Constansó began work on a new powder factory in the pueblo of Santa Fe near Mexico City — a project that lasted over two years. Drafting plans for roadways, he supervised the paving of streets and leveling of paths in Mexico. He served as a consultant on the draining of Lake Chalco to supply water for Mexico City. He designed a tobacco factory, cock-fighting arena, botanical gardens, house of mercy, fountains for Mexico City's main plazas, and the Academy of San Carlos for the study of fine arts, where he became a professor of geometry.

==== Plan to settle artisans in coastal California ====
In the late 1780s, officials in New Spain (Mexico) asked Constansó for advice on how to bolster the small colonies of people who had migrated from Mexico to settle near new Catholic missions along the California coast. The California missions and pueblos needed skilled artisans in particular. Cosntansó proposed that each immigrant artisan spend at least four years teaching mission Indians, while receiving a salary and rations according to his line of work and the size of his family. After an artisan finished his four-year teaching commitment — suggested Constansó — he should receive land, cattle, and other goods as inducements to settle permanently in California. Constansó recommended sending artisans to California along with their families, and encouraging bachelor artisans to marry.

Acting on Constansó's proposal, New Spain officials sent around 20 artisans to California starting 1792. A few of them settled permanently in California, but most returned to Mexico once their contracts expired. The Franciscan friars who ran the missions, claiming lack of funds, insisted that the artisan/teachers work for almost no pay. Constansó's plan to increase the population of Spanish/Mexican pueblos in California failed to bear fruit.

==== Vision of Indian assimilation into Hispanic society ====
In 1794, Constansó wrote a report to New Spain's viceroy Marqués de Brancifort, "On the Plan for Strengthening the Presidios of New California." Imagining British naval assault on Spain's California ports followed by Britain's colonization of California from its settlements in "Greater China," Costansó pointed to the sparse population of Spanish/Mexican colonists in California as the root source of Spain's military weakness there. He went on to lament the stagnation of many Catholic missions in New Spain: "There are missions that are over a hundred years old," wrote Costansó, "and we still see them staffed by padre-ministers and by the same military escort as in the beginning. But it has to be that way because, in those reductions [missions], there are scarcely any other inhabitants except those native to the territory, whose inconstancy must be continually observed so that the restless ones do not flee and disturb the tranquility of the land."

Urging the viceroy to promote migration of Spanish/Mexican civilians to California, Constansó suggested that the king provide those colonists with tools and farming equipment. "By such a measure," Constansó added, "the Indians, aided by the paternal love and Christian zeal of His Majesty, will receive a training capable of making them as happy in temporal matters as in the spiritual… But without trades and industry, the Indians will never be able to be men and useful vassals."

Constansó envisioned mission Indians assimilating into New Spanish society through intermarriage and adoption of the Spanish language and Hispanic culture: "Experience has demonstrated the fertility of the Spaniards and of the persons of mixed blood in this kingdom is much greater than that of the Indians. Perhaps this is so because when [the Indians] are reduced to a civilized life or to a less wild existence, they procreate much less; or because when they intermarry with Spaniards or white persons, there is generally produced from the second or third generation some individuals who barely have a trace of Indian since they are reared among Spaniards — and their language, habits and customs no longer differ from ours."

== Sources ==
- Janet R. Fireman and Manuel P. Servín, "Miguel Costansó: California's Forgotten Founder." California Historical Society Quarterly, vol. 49, no. 1, March 1970, pp. 3–19.
- "Costansó's 1794 Report on Strengthening New California's Presidios," translated by Manuel P. Servín. California Historical Society Quarterly, vol. 49, no. 3, Sept. 1970, pp. 221–232.
- «Diario Histórico» (1770)
- «Diario del viaje de tierra hecho al norte de la California» (1770)
