= Felipe de Barri =

2nd Governor of the Californias
- In office 1770–1777
- Preceded by: Gaspar de Portolá
- Succeeded by: Fernando Rivera y Moncada

Personal details
- Died: 1784 Durango, Mexico

Felipe de Barri (?–1784) was comandante of Alta California. He moved there from Loreto, Baja California Sur. Pedro Fages served as the military governor from July 9, 1770 to March 23, 1774 at the Presidio of Monterey, California. Barri had some friction with the president of the Catholic priests of the Franciscan order, Father President Fray Vicente Mora, but for the most part it was time of peace, but Barri was quick to judge and was suspicious, fearing the return of troubles that the Jesuits were accused of. He and Francisco Palóu, administrator and historian on the Baja and Alta California had some troubles. There was a small revolt at Todos Santos.

While de Barri was the civil governor, three new Spanish missions in California were established: Mission San Gabriel founded in 1771, Mission San Luis Obispo de Tolosa founded in 1772 and Mission San Francisco de Asís (also called Mission Dolores) founded in 1776.

De Barri was asked to step down as governor for frequent and deep-seated disagreements with the missionaries. He joined with Captain Fernando Rivera y Moncada often in judging and being too suspicious of the missionaries. After serving in Baja California he departed on March 26, 1775 for San Blas, Nayarit, Mexico. In 1776 Barri became the civil governor of Nueva Vizcaya, New Spain. He died in office in Nueva Vizcaya in 1784.

== See also ==
- Presidio of Monterey, California
- Presidio Military Districts in Spanish California
