= Pedro Fages =

Spanish soldier and explorer (1734–1794)

5th Governor of the Californias
- In office 12 July 1782 – 16 April 1791
- Preceded by: Felipe de Neve
- Succeeded by: José Antonio Roméu

Acting Governor of the Californias
- In office 9 July 1770 – 25 May 1774
- Preceded by: Gaspar de Portolá
- Succeeded by: Fernando Rivera y Moncada

Personal details
- Born: 1734 Guissona, Spain
- Died: 1794 (aged 60) Mexico City, Viceroyalty of New Spain
- Spouse: Eulalia Callis
- Profession: Soldier, explorer, and military Governor of Las Californias

Military service
- Allegiance: Spain
- Branch/service: Army of Spain
- Rank: Colonel

Pedro Fages (1734–1794) was a Spanish soldier, explorer, and first lieutenant governor of the province of the Californias under Gaspar de Portolá. Fages claimed the governorship after Portolá's departure, acting as governor in opposition to the official governor Felipe de Barri, and later served officially as fifth (1782–91) governor of the Californias.

== Career ==
Fages was born in Guissona, Spain. In 1762 he entered the light infantry in Catalonia and joined Spain's invasion of Portugal during the Seven Years' War. In May 1767 Fages, commissioned as a lieutenant in the newly formed Free Company of Volunteers of Catalonia, set sail from Cádiz along with a company of light infantry, voyaging to New Spain (Mexico). He and his men served under Domingo Elizondo in Sonora.

=== Voyage from Baja California to San Diego ===
In 1769, Fages was selected by visitador (Inspector general) José de Gálvez to lead a detachment of soldiers on one of the ships of the Gaspar de Portolá-led expedition to found San Diego, California. Lieutenant Fages sailed from Guaymas to the Baja California port of La Paz. On January 9, 1769, he boarded the galleon San Carlos, captained by Vicente Vila and bound for San Diego. Also on board were Franciscan friar Fernando Parrón, engineer and cartographer Miguel Costansó, surgeon Pedro Prat, and 25 soldiers under Fages' command along with a crew of sailors. After sailing nearly 200 miles (320 kilometers) beyond San Diego due to cartography errors, the San Carlos doubled back south. It finally arrived in San Diego Bay on April 29, with scurvy-ridden troops and crewmen.

=== Interaction with Kumeyaay people ===
Upon recovering from the ill effects of the voyage, Fages set about carrying out the instructions of José de Gálvez. Along with Miguel Costansó, he reconnoitered the port and inland areas of San Diego, exploring especially today's Mission Valley. In his letter reporting to Gálvez, Fages observed of the local Kumeyaay Indians: "…They appear to be docile and alert. We have made very good friends with them and we are never lacking some little rabbits, hares, and fish that they bring to us. We give them some glass beads. But they value very highly any kind of cloth — no matter how poor it might be — since in exchange for some that I had, I received some furs and nets." Costansó, while branding the Kumeyaay as "lazy idlers," noted that "they have bestowed great affection upon Don Pedro Fages and they also respect him very much. They have invited him at various times to be with their women, an expression of friendship that the rest have not merited. "

Costansó recounts a demonstration Fages arranged to prove the superiority of Spanish firearms. Armed with bows and arrows tipped with "very sharp flints," the Kumeyaay men initially viewed the Spaniards' guns as "simple sticks." Fages ordered a leather target erected at a practical distance. The Indians fired their arrows, which had only a "mild effect" on the leather. Fages then ordered his best marksmen to shoot at the same target. "Upon hearing the noise and seeing the destruction so close at hand, the Indians changed their expressions and some of the more timid ones left, giving very clear signs of their surprise and fear."

=== Portolá expedition up the California coast ===
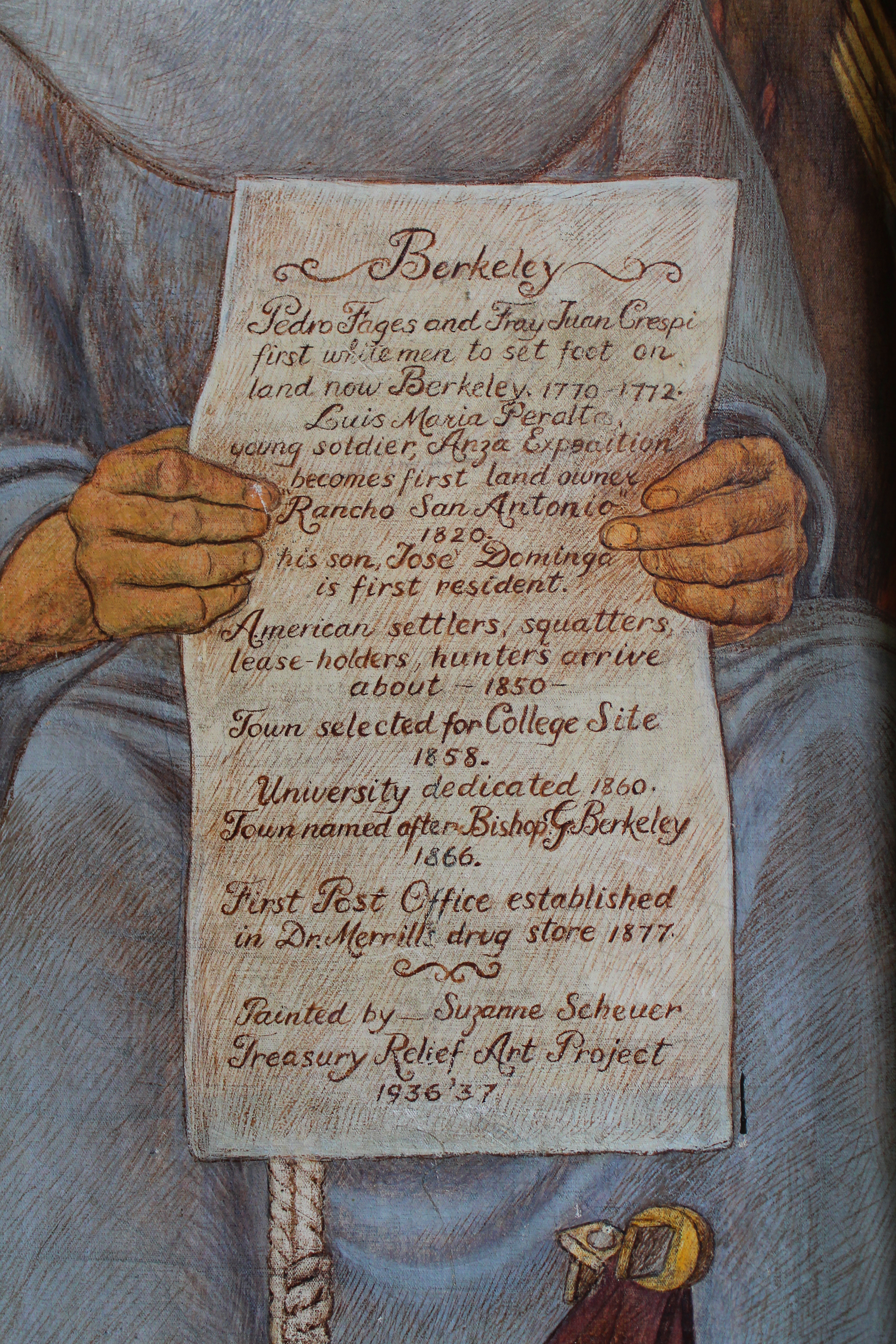
Incidents in California History mural at the United States Post Office, Berkeley (detail). Caption reads: "Pedro Fages and Fray Juan Crespi first white men to set foot on land now Berkeley..."

On July 14, 1769, Fages set out from San Diego with a party of 74 men on the Portolá expedition to locate Monterey Bay. The party included Catalan volunteers, leather-jacketed soldiers, Christian Indians from Baja California, and friars Juan Crespí and Francisco Gómez, along with other military officers. During this time he was promoted to captain. Although the party failed to recognize Monterey Bay as they passed it, they explored all the way up the coast to San Francisco. The 74 men returned exhausted to San Diego on January 24, 1770, having had to slaughter and eat their mules on the return trek south.

=== Second Portolá expedition to Monterey ===
In the spring of 1770, Fages joined the second overland Portolá expedition from San Diego to Monterey, along with friar Juan Crespí, twelve Catalan volunteers, seven leather-jacketed soldiers, two muleteers, and five Baja Christian Indians — aiming to establish a Catholic mission in Monterey.

After Portolá left California in 1770, captain Pedro Fages was in charge of the Presidio of Monterey, as the somewhat independent lieutenant-governor of California Nueva (New California) — which, in 1770, became part of Las Californias, and was later split from Baja California to become Alta California. In March 1770 Felipe de Barri, in Baja California, was made governor of both Baja and Alta California (1770–75). But, since Monterey was far away, Fages had free rein to run Alta California as acting governor.

=== Strict discipline to build Monterey presidio ===
Taking charge of constructing the Spanish presidio (fort) in Monterey, Fages imposed strict discipline on his soldier-laborers. He decided the amount of work they had to do in a certain time, harshly punishing soldiers caught resting or rolling a cigarette. Heavy rains punctuated the winter and spring of 1770–1, but Fages permitted no let-up in the work. His soldiers had to trudge through mud to the forest to chop wood, then drag their mules out of the mud and head home. They had no chance to wash or mend their clothes during the six-day work week; Fages told them to do that on Sundays.

On Sundays, they had to carry a week's supply of wood for Fages' kitchen and fetch their own water from the Carmel River some six miles away; clean their weapons; and pass inspection. This work regime lasted a year and a half. Fages' soldiers viewed him as a tyrant, until complaints by the soldiers persuaded padre president Junípero Serra to intervene. Serra told Fages that, as a Christian, he had to observe the sabbath and let his men rest on Sundays. The soldiers raped the Indian women and took them as concubines. At Serra's urging, Fages punished some of the more excessive incidents of sexual abuse, but it did not stop. The two men did not get along and Serra soon made plans to move the mission across the peninsula to Carmel.

Weekly rations for the soldiers consisted of two gallons of corn, a pound of beans, a pound of pinole, half a pound of panocha, and four pounds of meat. The meat, delivered in barrels from the galleon San Antonio, often proved too putrid to eat. Weevils infested some of the corn and meal. The soldiers supplemented their diet by gathering wild herbs and hunting geese on Sundays. They also traded what goods they had such as ponchos, knives, daggers, and handkerchiefs for food from the Indians. News of the soldiers' harsh treatment and poor conditions gradually reached Mexico, and Alta California became an undesirable assignment.

In late June 1771, Fages wrote to viceroy Carlos de Croix in Mexico to inform him that the Monterey presidio had been built, sending along a simplified map. Fages had also started a large vegetable garden with an irrigation supply, and three plots dedicated to growing wheat, barley, rice and beans. He described the Indians of the Monterey/Carmel area as having well-proportioned bodies but feeble spirits. He also described their dress:

Nearly all of them go naked, except a few who cover themselves with a small cloak of rabbit or hare skin, which does not fall below the waist. The women wear a short apron of red and white cords twisted and worked as closely as possible, which extends to the knee. Others use the green and dry tule interwoven, and complete their outfit with a deerskin half tanned or entirely untanned, to make wretched underskirts which scarcely serve to indicate the distinction of sex, or to cover their nakedness with sufficient modesty.

=== Expeditions to San Francisco Bay ===
In November 1770, Fages led an expedition from Monterey by land to San Francisco Bay. Rather than follow Portolá's difficult trail around Monterey Bay to Santa Cruz and along the coast, Fages found an easier route through present-day Salinas and the Santa Clara Valley (today's U.S. Route 101). Fages' new trail became the preferred route, and missions were later established along that road at Mission San Juan Bautista, Mission Santa Clara, and Mission San Jose.

From the southern end of the bay, Fages pushed on another day to the farthest camp used by Portolá's scouts of the previous year, at San Lorenzo Creek in modern Hayward, on the eastern shore of the bay. From there, scouts ranged a few miles farther north, to a point where the view opened up, and they became the first Europeans to see the entrance to the great bay (although from the opposite side of the bay), a vantage on the slopes above the bay in modern Oakland.

Fages set out north from Monterey again in 1772. The expedition was accompanied again by friar Juan Crespí, who kept a daily journal. From his 1770 trail to the eastern shore of San Francisco Bay, Fages pushed on past his previous stopping point, seeing for himself the entrance to San Francisco Bay, now known as the Golden Gate. The party continued north along San Pablo Bay but was prevented from going farther north by the Carquinez Strait. Following the bay around to the east, Fages' group climbed the slopes of Mount Diablo and became the first Europeans to see the Sacramento-San Joaquin River Delta, the Central Valley of California and the Sierra Nevada mountain range. Seeing that it was impossible to cross the wide river without boats, the party looped around to return to San Jose through today's Contra Costa County (roughly following today's I-680 highway).

Messengers from Monterey met the party during its return, informing Fages and Crespí of an emergency. The other Spanish colony, at San Diego, was suffering from severe food shortages. Crespí immediately set out with a pack train to deliver food, but this left Monterey also suffering. The Spaniards had not so far had much luck as hunters in California but, in desperation, Fages ordered that the soldiers set out in small parties to hunt the huge and fearsome California grizzly bear. Fages himself joined the hunt, and earned his nickname El Oso ("the bear") while hunting bears near San Luis Obispo.

Fages' first tenure as commander in Monterey ended in 1774, after he quarreled with Father Junípero Serra, president of the Alta California missions. He was replaced as lieutenant-governor by another veteran of the Portolá expedition, Fernando Rivera y Moncada.

In 1777, Fages was posted to Sonora to fight the Apaches, where he was promoted to lieutenant colonel. In 1781 he successfully quelled the Quechan (Yuma) Indian revolt and temporarily reopened the Colorado River crossing of the Anza trail at Yuma, Arizona. The Quechan successfully re-closed the trail for the next 50+ years after Fages and his troops departed, ensuring that the two journeys led by Juan Bautista de Anza were the only Spanish expeditions ever to use the trail.

Pedro Fages returned to Monterey in 1777, appointed Governor of the Californias, replacing Felipe de Neve. Monterey replaced Loreto as the capital of the Californias in that year, the Loreto military governorship being replaced by a presidio commander and a civil administrator. In 1804, Las Californias was officially split into Alta California and Baja California.

During Fages' second tenure as governor, two missions were founded: Mission Santa Barbara (December 4, 1786) and La Purisima Mission (December 8, 1787). Reporting on the Carmel mission in 1787, Fages described the area's Indians as the laziest, most brutish and least rational of all the natives discovered between San Diego and San Francisco. He reckoned those qualities — along with the foggy and windy climate, shortage of potable water, high death rate, and language barriers — accounted for the painfully slow progress of mission Carmel.

Concerned over the shortage of skilled artisans in his domain, governor Fages proposed in 1787 that artisans imprisoned in Mexico City and Guadalajara have their sentences commuted to exile in California — provided they serve out their terms at presidios or missions and then stay on as settlers. New Spain's rulers did not act on Fages' proposal. Fages was promoted to colonel in 1789, and resigned his governorship in 1791. Pedro Fages moved back to Mexico City, where he died in 1794.

== Tumultuous marriage ==
Fages married Eulalia Francesca Josepha Callis on June 3, 1780, in Mexico City. Born October 4, 1758, in Barcelona, Spain, Eulalia was a full generation younger than Pedro Fages. She journeyed to Mexico City with her mother and brother to join her father Agustín Callis, captain of the Free Company of Volunteers of Catalonia formed to suppress rebellions by Pima and Seri Indians of Sonora. In 1781, Eulalia and Pedro traveled to Arizpe, Sonora, where Eulalia gave birth to her first child, Pedrito.

When Fages got reassigned to Alta California as governor in 1782, Eulalia and Pedrito remained in Sonora. Then they traveled to Baja California under military escort. Fages journeyed south to Loreto to pick them up. Departing Loreto in July, they arrived in Monterey in January 1783. In the spring of 1784 Pedro and Eulalia, now pregnant, traveled north — Eulalia being carried in a litter — to San Francisco. There they met up with padre president Junípero Serra.

Eulalia found the weather in San Francisco unpleasant and wanted to move to Santa Clara. Fages repeatedly asked the friars running mission Santa Clara to grant Eulalia hospitality there. The friars, feeling it improper for them to host the pregnant señora gobernadora, feigned ignorance of governor Fages' insistent requests. They referred the matter to Serra, who seconded their circumspect posture. So Eulalia's second child, María del Carmen, was born in San Francisco in August 1784.

=== 'But let a woman in your life…' ===
After Eulalia returned to Monterey from San Francisco, she kept pressing her husband to give up his career in California and return to Mexico. Fages wanted to stay on as governor. After a series of quarrels, Eulalia broke off relations with Pedro. When Pedro seemed unfazed by the separation, Eulalia accused him of consorting with an Indian maidservant of their household. Threatening divorce, Eulalia left the house. In February 1785, Fages sought the advice of the friars at Mission Carmel. Friar Matías de Santa Catalina Noriega concluded that Eulalia still had the obligation to live with her husband and tried to persuade her to reunite with Pedro. Eulalia refused, and appealed her case to the bishop. When Fages returned from a trip to Baja California — during which time Eulalia lived at mission Carmel — she finally agreed to move back into her husband's house.

In August 1785, aging friar Francisco Palóu arrived at Monterey from mission Santa Clara, planning to return to Mexico and retire. Fages confided to Palóu that Eulalia still felt unhappy in his house and still wanted to return to Mexico. He asked Palóu to escort Eulalia as far as Guadalajara. Palóu objected that it would be improper for him, a missionary, to escort any woman, even the governor's wife. Instead, Palóu spent a whole day trying to dissuade Eulalia from going to Mexico, pointing out all the hardships the trip would entail. Eulalia finally relented and agreed to stay in Monterey. Apparently dissatisfied with that resolution, Fages threw bureaucratic obstacles in the way of Palóu boarding the ship that would carry him to Mexico, delaying Palóu's departure until November.

=== Reconciliation ===
In January 1787, Fages wrote a letter to padre Palóu, in which he reported: "[About] six months ago Eulalia suddenly called me one morning with a thousand protests, tears, and humility and asked my pardon for all the past. She voluntarily confessed that everything had been a pretense and falsehood and that she herself had bribed the Indian girl to take part in the plot… Thank God we are now living in union and harmony."

== California Historical Landmark ==
The place Fages entered in the San Joaquin Valley is a California Historical Landmark number 291 signed on June 27, 1938. The spot is now on California State Route 166, about 20 miles south of Bakersfield, California. The California Historical Landmark reads:

NO. 291 FAGES-ZALVIDEA CROSSING - In 1772, Don Pedro Fages, first recorded non-Indian to visit the southern San Joaquin Valley, crossed this spot on his way from San Diego to San Luis Obispo. Near this point crossed Father José María de Zalvidea in 1806, while accompanying the Ruiz expedition in search of mission sites.

== Fictional portrayals ==
The novel Mistress of Monterey: A Story of Lost Romance in Eighteenth Century California by Virginia Stivers Bartlett (1933, reprinted by Event Horizon Press) draws a psychological portrait of Eulalia Callis in her mercurial relationship with her husband Pedro Fages. Bartlett also sets the tensions between Eulalia and Pedro within the complex interplay between Spanish military officers and Franciscan missionaries in Alta California.

Pedro Fages appears as a minor character in the 1955 film Seven Cities of Gold, which presents a fanciful and historically inaccurate account of the founding of Spanish California. Lieutenant Fages is played by Mexican actor Victor Junco. In the credits, Fages' name is misspelled as "Faces."

Governor Fages and his wife make a brief appearance in the Isabel Allende novel Zorro. Pere Fages is the protagonist of the historical novel La última conquista (2005) by Ramón Vilaró and is a secondary character in Los acasos (2010) by Javier Pascual.

== Sources ==
- Bancroft, Hubert Howe (1884). The History of California (vol. 1, 1542-1800). San Francisco: A. L. Bancroft & Company.
- Beebe, Rose Marie; Senkewicz, Robert M. (2015). Junípero Serra: California, Indians, and the Transformation of a Missionary. University of Oklahoma Press.
- Fages, Pedro; Priestley, Herbert Ingram (1937). A historical, political, and natural description of California. University of California Press.
- Geiger, Maynard J. (1959). The Life and Times of Fray Junípero Serra, O.F.M. (2 vol.). Publications of the Academy of American Franciscan History. Monograph series, v. 5-6. Washington D.C.: Academy of American Franciscan History.
- Ives, Ronald L. (1968). "From Pitic to San Gabriel in 1782: The Journey of Don Pedro Fages". The Journal of Arizona History. 9 (4): 222–244.
- Nuttall, Donald (1964). Pedro Fages and the Advance of the Northern Frontier of New Spain, 1767-1782 (PhD). USC.
- Nuttall, Donald (1977). "Light Cast upon Shadows: The Non-California Years of Don Pedro Fages". California Historical Quarterly. 56 (3): 250–269. doi:10.2307/25157724. JSTOR 25157724.
- Nuttall, Donald A. (1998). The Señoras Gobernadoras of Spanish Alta California A Comparative Study.
- "Pedro Fages." (1936). Dictionary of American Biography, Charles Scribner's Sons.
- Sánchez, Joseph P. (2008). "Fages, Pedro (1734–1794)." Encyclopedia of Latin American History and Culture, Charles Scribner's Sons.
