= Pedro Font =

Franciscan missionary and diarist (1737–1781)

Pedro Front
- Born: 1737; Girona, Catalonia, Spain
- Died: 1781 (aged 44); San Diego del Pitiquito
- Occupation: Franciscan

Pedro Font (Pere Font in Catalan, his native language) (1737–1781) was a Spanish Franciscan missionary and diarist.

== Biography ==
Font was born in 1737 in Girona, Catalonia, Spain. He received his training at Querétaro Missionary College.

From 1773 to 1775, Font served at Mission San José de Tumacácori in Pima Country. He was the chaplain of Juan Bautista de Anza's expedition that explored Alta California from 1775 to 1776. Font's diary, With Anza to California, gives the principal account of the expedition; in it, Font describes military governor Fernando Rivera y Moncada using force against a neophyte. Font was involved in Rivera's excommunication.

While on the expedition, Font drew one of the first maps of the San Francisco Bay, naming the mountain range now known as the Sierra Nevada He also identified the site for the proposed Mission San Francisco de Asís, which would be established later that year by Junípero Serra and Francisco Palóu.

Font later served at Mission San José de Imuris, Mission Santa Teresa de Atil, Mission Santa Maria Magdalena, Mission San Pedro y San Pablo del Tubutama and La Purísima Concepción de Caborca, prior to his death at the visita of San Diego del Pitiquito in 1781.

== Writings and legacy ==
Font described the California grizzly bear, writing, "He was horrible, fierce, large, and fat." Font interacted with Native Americans and observed homosexual behavior and saw a great need for Christianity to eradicate these "nefarious practices."

Font Street, in San Francisco's Parkmerced neighborhood, is named for Pedro Font.
