= Province of Las Californias =

Province of New Spain

Las Californias Las Californias
- Province of New Spain
- 1767–1804
- Coat of arms

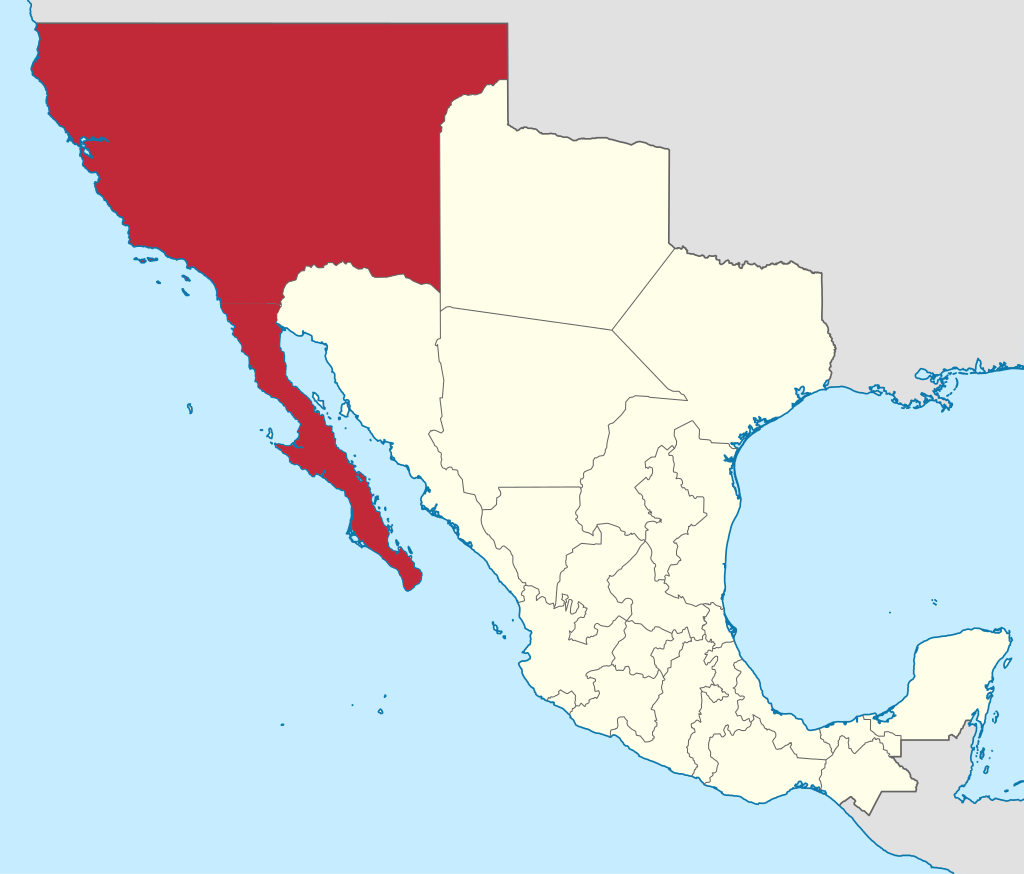
- Las Californias within the Viceroyalty of New Spain
- Capital: Loreto (1767–1777); Monterey (1777–1804)
- Government
  - Type: Colonial government
- Gobernadores
  - 1767–1770: Gaspar de Portolá (first)
  - 1800–1804: José Joaquín de Arrillaga (last)
- History
  - Established: 1767
  - Divided into Alta and Baja California provinces: 1804
Succeeded by
Alta California; Baja California Province
- Today part of: United States; Mexico

The Province of Las Californias (Spanish: Provincia de las Californias) was a Spanish Empire province in the northwestern region of New Spain. Its territory consisted of the entire U.S. states of California, Nevada, and Utah, parts of Arizona, Wyoming, and Colorado, and the Mexican states of Baja California and Baja California Sur.

== Etymology ==
There has been understandable confusion about use of the plural Californias by Spanish colonial authorities. California historian Theodore Hittell offered the following explanation:

In very early times, while the country was supposed to be an island or rather several islands, it was commonly known by the plural appellation of "Las Californias" (The Californias). Afterwards, when its peninsular character was ascertained, it was called simply California; but the territory so designated was unlimited in extent. When the expeditions for the settlement of San Diego and Monterey marched, it was understood that they were going, not out of California, but into a new part of it. The peninsula then began to be generally spoken of as Antigua or Old California and the unlimited remainder as Nueva or New California, subsequently more commonly called Alta or Upper California. At the same time the old plural name of The Californias was revived, but with a more definite signification than before.

== History ==
The first attempted Spanish occupation of California was by the Jesuit missionary Eusebio Kino, in 1683. His Misión San Bruno failed, however, and it was not until 1697 that Misión de Nuestra Señora de Loreto Conchó was successfully established by another Jesuit, Juan María de Salvatierra. The mission became the nucleus of Loreto, first permanent settlement and first administrative center of the province. The Jesuits went on to found a total of 18 missions in the lower two-thirds of the Baja California Peninsula.

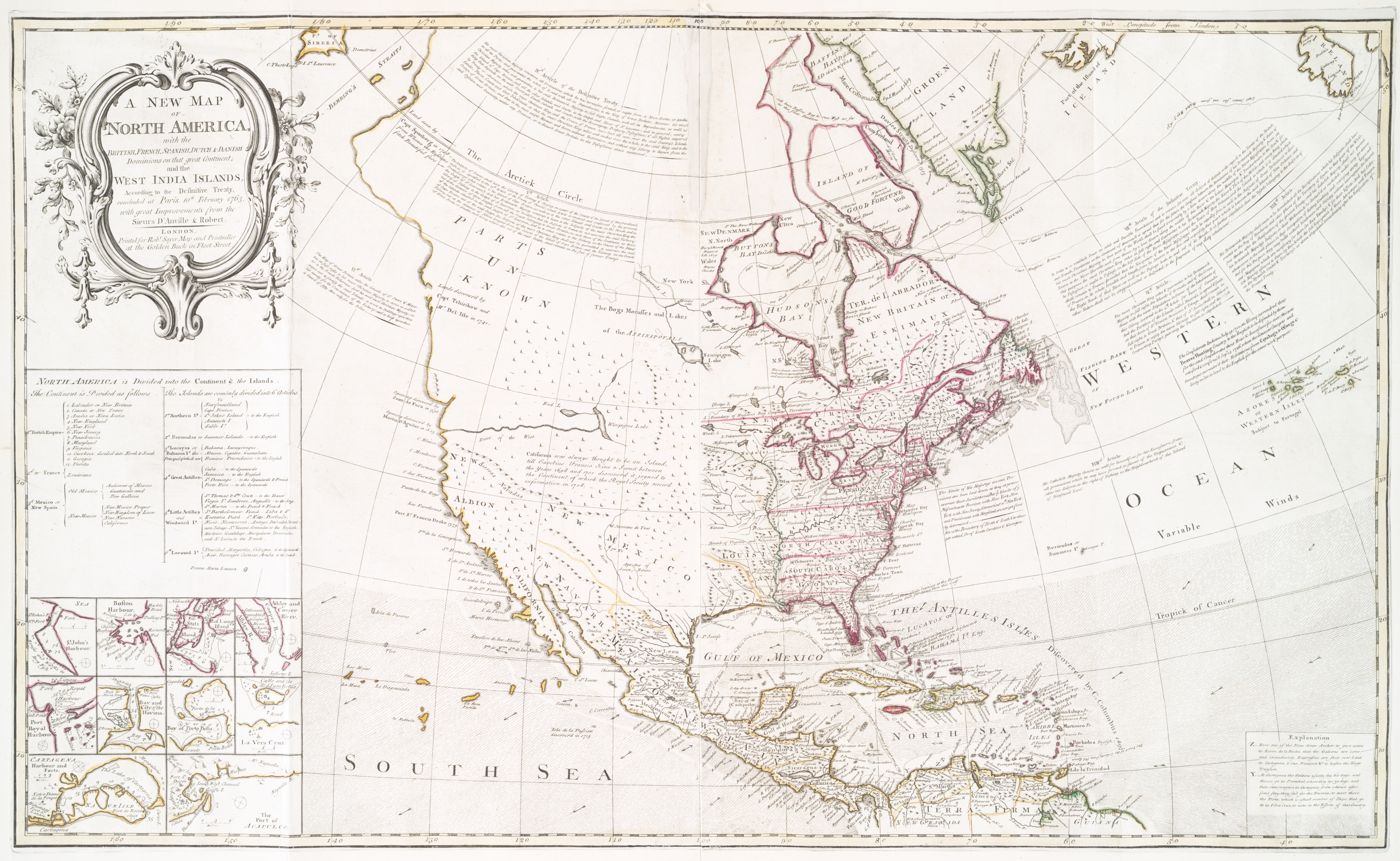
A New Map of North America, produced in London following the 1763 Treaty of Paris, five years before the establishment of the Province of the Californias. Note the name "California" placed on the Baja California Peninsula.

In 1767, the Jesuits were expelled from the missions, and Franciscans were brought in to take over. Gaspar de Portolá was appointed governor to supervise the transition. At the same time, a new visitador, José de Gálvez, was dispatched from Spain with authority to organize and expand the fledgling province.

The more ambitious province name, Las Californias, was established by a joint dispatch to the King from Viceroy de Croix and visitador José de Gálvez, dated January 28, 1768. Gálvez sought to make a distinction between the Antigua ('old') area of established settlement and the Nueva ('new') unexplored areas to the north. At that time, almost all of the explored and settled areas of the province were around the former Jesuit missions, but, once exploration and settlement of the northern frontier began to intensify, the geographical designations Alta ('upper') and Baja ('lower') gained favor.

The single province was divided in 1804, into Alta California province and Baja California province. By the time of the 1804 split, the Alta province had expanded to include coastal areas as far north as what is now the San Francisco Bay Area in the U.S. state of California. Expansion came through exploration and colonization expeditions led by Portolá (1769), his successor Pedro Fages (1770), Juan Bautista de Anza (1774–76), the Franciscan missionaries and others. Independent Mexico retained the division but demoted the former provinces to territories, due to populations too small for statehood.

== Geography ==
The Baja California Peninsula is bordered on three sides by water, the Pacific Ocean (south and west) and Gulf of California (east); while Alta California had the Pacific Ocean on the west and deserts on the east. A northern boundary was established at the 42nd parallel by the Adams–Onís Treaty of 1819. That boundary line remains the northern boundary of the U.S. states of California, Nevada, and the western part of Utah.

Inland regions were mostly unexplored by the Spanish, leaving them generally outside the control of the colonial authorities. Mountain ranges of the Peninsular Ranges, eastern Transverse Ranges, and the Sierra Nevada, along with the arid Colorado Desert, Mojave Desert, and Great Basin Desert in their eastern rain shadows, served as natural barriers to Spanish settlement. The eastern border of upper Las Californias was never officially defined under either Spanish or subsequent Mexican rule. The 1781 Instrucciones and government correspondence described Alta California ("Upper California") as the areas to the west of the Sierra Nevada and the lower part of the Colorado River in the Lower Colorado River Valley (the river forms the present day border between the states of California and Arizona).

== See also ==
- List of governors in the Viceroyalty of New Spain
- Spanish missions in Baja California
- Spanish missions in California
- Indigenous peoples of California
  - Population of Native California
  - Indigenous peoples of Baja California
- Ranchos of California
- History of California
  - History of California through 1899
  - Territorial evolution of California
- Spanish colonization of the Americas
- The Canadas
- The Carolinas
- The Dakotas
- The Floridas
- The Virginias
