= Modjeska =

Modjeska may refer to:

- Modjeska (name), a surname and given name
- Modjeska (confection), a caramel and marshmallow candy named for Helena Modjeska
- Modjeska Canyon, California, unincorporated community in eastern Orange County, California
- Modjeska Peak, northern mountain of Orange County's Saddleback formation
