= Free Company of Volunteers of Catalonia =

Colonial Spanish Army military unit

Coordinates: 53°05′N 129°25′W

Free Company of Volunteers of Catalonia Compañía Franca de Voluntarios de Cataluña
- Active: 1767–1815
- Country: Spain
- Branch: Spanish Army
- Type: Light Infantry
- Role: Garrison
- Garrison/HQ: Guadalajara (1772–1800) El Perote (1800–1815)

Commanders
- Notable commanders: Pedro de Alberní Pedro Fages

The Free Company of Volunteers of Catalonia (Spanish: Compañía Franca de Voluntarios de Cataluña) was a military company of the Spanish Army serving in the Spanish colonial empire.

== Origins ==
The company was raised in Barcelona in 1767 for service in New Spain, as a part of an effort to improve the defenses of Spain's overseas empire, which in turn was part of the larger Bourbon Reforms of King Carlos III. Initially recruited from the 2nd Regiment of Light Infantry of Catalonia, the company was composed of four officers and one hundred enlisted men and was commanded by Captain Agustín Callis, a veteran of Spain's wars in Italy and Portugal.

== Service in Sonora ==
The Catalan Volunteers arrived in Guaymas, Sonora in May 1768 as a part of an expedition of some 1200 Spanish soldiers and native allies assembled to quell a revolt by Pima and Seri Indians. After years of active campaigning, the Volunteers returned to Mexico City in April 1771.

== The Establishment of Alta California ==
In September 1768, Lieutenant Pedro Fages and a detachment of 25 Volunteers were ordered south to San Blas, Nayarit to form a part of the expedition of Gaspar de Portolà to establish a Spanish foothold in Alta California. After 110 days at sea, the Volunteers arrived at San Diego Bay in April 1769. By this time, over half the soldiers and most of the crew were incapacitated with scurvy.

Twelve Volunteers succumbed to illness while awaiting the arrival of the overland arm of the expedition under Captain Fernando Javier Rivera y Moncada, who arrived a month later. Still short of provisions, however, the lot of the soldiers improved very little. Despite these privations, the Volunteers participated in the Portola expedition that established San Diego and Monterey, and remained as the first garrison of the Presidio of Monterey, under Fages' command. Volunteers accompanied Fages on expeditions to explore the San Francisco Bay region in 1770 and 1772.

In June 1770, command of the military forces in California passed from Portola to the short tempered and relatively inexperienced Fages. His often high handed treatment of soldiers and missionaries and his possible mishandling of the distribution of rations led to criticism from Father Junípero Serra, who successfully petitioned Viceroy Antonio María de Bucareli y Ursúa for his removal. Fages and the detachment of Volunteers left Monterey to rejoin their Company in July 1774.

At least one of the Volunteers later returned to retire in California. Jose Antonio Yorba settled in what is now Orange County, California to become the patriarch of an important Californio family. The city of Yorba Linda, California is named for the Yorba family.

== Reorganization ==
In Sonora, the Catalan Volunteers served alongside the Fusileros de Montaña (Mountain Fusiliers), another independent company from Catalonia associated with the 2nd Regiment. As a part of new regulations promulgated in 1772, the two commands were merged and reorganized into two companies of 80 men and 3 officers each: The First Free Company of Volunteers of Catalonia, which included the detachment in California under Fages and remained under the command of Captain Callis, and a Second Company under Captain Antonio Pol. Both companies were based in Guadalajara.

== Garrison Duty in Central Mexico ==
As light infantry, the Volunteers were thought to be particularly well suited for duty in the mountainous country of central Mexico. Though based in Guadalajara, detachments of Volunteers were frequently posted to the Presidio of Mesa del Tonati in the mountains of Nayarit, the Real del Monte near Mexico City, and to serve as harbor guards at San Blas, the headquarters for Spanish naval operations in the Pacific. For the most part, this service was fairly routine, except for occasional calls to quell disturbances.

== Return To Sonora ==
Fages, his reputation now rehabilitated, was promoted to captain and assigned command of the Second Company in early 1776. At the urging of Teodoro de Croix, commandant general of the Commandancy General of the Provincias Internas, Fages and his new command were deployed to Sonora, arriving at Alamos in February 1777.

The following April, the Volunteers of the Second Company were posted to the Presidio of El Pitic (modern Hermosillo) in response to renewed hostilities with the Seris, who quickly surrendered.

At the urging of Lt. Col Juan Bautista de Anza, the company was posted at the Presidio of Santa Cruz de Terrenate, which had recently been moved from its previous location to one on the San Pedro River north of modern Tombstone, Arizona, to reinforce the beleaguered garrison against the Apaches, arriving in the fall of 1778. Though Fages, now a Lieutenant Colonel, was able to restore order and discipline to the presidio, the garrison proved unable to mount an effective counter-offensive.

In December 1780, with the Second Company now down to half strength, Fages left Terrenate for Mexico City for new recruits. In his absence, the Presidio was ordered abandoned, and the garrison moved to its previous location at Santa Cruz, Sonora, which was believed to be more defensible and easily supplied. The company was soon once again posted at El Pitic, where they were employed in putting down another rebellion by the Seris.

In September 1781, Fages led an expedition that included 40 men of the Second Company to the Yuma Crossing to quell a rebellion by the Quechan and their allies. Though they were able to liberate Spanish captives, secure the remains of the slain Father Francisco Garcés and recover sacred vessels from the destroyed missions of Mission Puerto de Purísima Concepción and Mission San Pedro y San Pablo de Bicuñer, Fages' command was unable to subdue the tribe. Despite two subsequent expeditions by Fages and the Second Company over the next 2 years, the crossing would remain closed to Spain.

During the third expedition in the Fall of 1783, Fages was appointed Governor of California, and the Volunteers returned without him to Pitic. In subsequent years, the Volunteers of the Second Company were posted around Sonora, assigned to duties at the presidios of Buenavista, Fronteras, Pitic and Tucson where they were employed fighting the Apaches and Seris, until 1785, when they were assigned to the Villa de Chihuahua. From there, they continued active campaigning against the Apaches.

== The Pacific Northwest and California ==
Pedro de Alberní was named Captain of the First Company when Callis died in 1782. In August 1789, after years of routine garrison duty in Guadalajara, the company was assigned to duty in the Pacific Northwest in response to the Nootka Crisis. They arrived at Nootka Sound in April 1790 where they re-established the abandoned redoubt of Fort San Miguel, becoming the first regular European military unit posted to present-day British Columbia.

The Volunteer's mission was to secure Spain's claims to the Pacific Northwest against incursions by the British and, in particular, the Russians. To that end, Alberni's men were employed as marines in the expeditions of Jacinto Caamaño, Salvador Fidalgo, Dionisio Alcalá Galiano, Salvador Menéndez, and Manuel Quimper of the Pacific coast from the Strait of Juan de Fuca to Kodiak Island.

The First Company returned to Guadalajara in 1792, though some Volunteers remained on detached duty in Nootka as late as 1794. In 1796, as a response to the War of the First Coalition and rumors of American incursions, Alberni, now a Lieutenant Colonel, and his company were sent to reinforce California. Detachments of Volunteers augmented the Presidios of Monterey, San Diego, and San Francisco.

Part of Alberní's mission in California was to establish a new civilian settlement called the Villa de Branciforte, which was established in 1797, with the intention that the community would be settled by retired Catalan Volunteers. This however did not materialize, and the project was abandoned in 1802.

Alberní was appointed Governor of California in 1800 and was replaced as Captain by José Font. Font and his scattered command were active in guarding Spain's claim's in California against incursions by foreign vessels, particularly American ones. Despite an increase in such activity, the First Company (except for a detachment that remained in San Diego for a few more years) was withdrawn to Guadalajara in 1803 and were not replaced.

== Dissolution of the Companies ==
Lt. Col. Alberni died in Monterey in 1802. He was the last of the original group of officers who had sailed from Barcelona in 1767. By this time, the unit was no longer Catalan in character with men and even officers largely from other parts of Spain and criollos from Mexico.

In 1810, the Volunteers were mobilized against the revolt of Miguel Hidalgo y Costilla. The First Company, still posted at Guadalajara, was reorganized and absorbed into other units. As the Mexican War of Independence escalated, the Second Company, posted at El Perote near Mexico City under Captain Juan Antonio de Viruega since 1800, was deployed to Morelos to join an army under General Calleja in a massive campaign against the insurgency. During the Siege of Cuautla in 1812, the Volunteers were assigned to man an ambuscade at the Campo de Sacatepec. Though Calleja later praised their valiant stand, the Second Company was unable to prevent the escape of scrappy rebels under José María Morelos and suffered heavy casualties.

The Volunteers managed to survive as a Company, participating in the battles of Tuxpango, Tlacótepe, and Ajuchitlán, through 1815, by which time they were no longer a discrete unit, having been absorbed into larger battalions.

== Uniform ==
Its uniform consisted of blue coat with yellow collar and cuffs, yellow waistcoat, blue breeches and black tricorne hat with the red cockade of the House of Bourbon.

There were two drummers on the strength of the company. After 1760, Spanish army drummers wore the livery of the King of Spain – a blue coat with scarlet collar and cuffs, along with a scarlet waistcoat. Both coat and waistcoat were trimmed with scarlet lace that was embroidered with a white chain pattern. This same pattern of lace had decorated French uniforms before the French Revolution began in 1789. The Bourbon kings of Spain were a branch of the French royal family, and adopted a similar livery.

== Images in Modern Culture ==
The crest of the Defense Language Institute at the Presidio of Monterey includes an image of a feathered leather helmet that is meant to symbolize the Catalan Volunteers and to commemorate their role in the founding of the post. Though such helmets were briefly a uniform item for the Spanish infantry at the turn of the 19th century, it is unlikely that they were ever worn by the Catalan Volunteers in North America.

The Catalan Volunteers are portrayed in the 1955 American film Seven Cities of Gold, which presents a fanciful and historically inaccurate account of the founding of Spanish California. Lieutenant Fages is played by Mexican actor Victor Junco. In the credits, Fages' name is misspelled as "Faces."

An infantry soldier wearing a Catalan Volunteer uniform briefly appears in the opening scene of the 1968 film Guns of San Sebastian which, like Seven Cities of Gold, stars Anthony Quinn. However, the movie is supposed to take place in 1746, twenty years before the Volunteers' arrival in New Spain.

== See also ==
- History of British Columbia
- Miquelets
- Pedro de Alberní y Teixidor
- Pedro Fages
