= Santiago Truck Trail =

Scenic trail in the Santa Ana Mountains, California

Coordinates: 33°41′36″N 117°35′34″W

The Santiago Truck Trail is a scenic trail in the Santa Ana Mountains and is known for mountain biking. It is located in Orange County, California, and is served by Santiago Canyon Road. The nearest urban area is the Portola Hills portion of Lake Forest.
