= Francisco Palóu =

Spanish Franciscan missionary, administrator and historian

Fray Francisco Palóu OFM
- Born: Francesc Palou; 1723; Petra, Mallorca, Kingdom of Spain
- Died: 1789 (aged 65–66); Mexico City, New Spain
- Other name: Francesc Palou (Catalan spelling)
- Occupation: Missionary

Francisco Palóu OFM (Catalan: Francesc Palou, Balearic Catalan pronunciation: [fɾənˈsəsk pəˈlɔw]; 1723–1789) was a Spanish Franciscan missionary, administrator, and historian on the Baja California Peninsula and in Alta California. Palóu made significant contributions to the Alta California and Baja California mission systems. Along with his mentor, Junípero Serra, Palóu worked to build numerous missions throughout Alta and Baja California, many structures of which still stand today. A member of the Franciscan Order, Palóu became "Presidente" of the missions in Baja California, and later of missions of Alta California. Palóu's work in the Spanish mission system spans from his early 20s to his death, at the age of 66.

According to biographer/translator Herbert E. Bolton, "Fray Palóu was a diligent student, devout Christian, loyal disciple, tireless traveler, zealous missionary, firm defender of the faith, resourceful pioneer, successful mission builder, able administrator, and fair minded historian of California." Palóu is particularly noted for his pious biography of Serra, and for his multi-volume early history of Spanish Empire exploration and occupation of the Californias.

== Biography ==
Francesc Palou was born in Palma, Mallorca, where he joined the Franciscan Order. Together with Junípero Serra, he traveled to New Spain in 1740 and served as a missionary in the Sierra Gorda region of Querétaro. When the Jesuits were expelled from Baja California in 1768, the Franciscans under Serra were sent to replace them. Palóu was assigned to the mission of San Javier. The following year, Serra went north to find the new mission province of Alta California, and Palóu succeeded him as head of the Baja California missions. When the Dominicans took over the peninsular Baja California missions in 1773, Palóu, being Franciscan, moved on to Upper California, marking the geographical boundary between the two orders' fields. He assisted in the exploration of the site of San Francisco and administered Mission San Francisco de Asís. When Serra died, Palóu was briefly acting head of the Baja California missions, but soon returned to central Mexico.

=== Missionary travels ===
As a missionary of the Spanish colonization of the Americas, Palóu traveled and proselytized in the Spanish colonial empire. His extensive travels left him knowledgeable of world matters, and well-respected as a scholar. Coming from simple beginnings, Palóu was born in 1723 at Palma, on the Island of Mallorca, and began religious work early in his life as he entered the Franciscan Order around the age of seventeen in 1739. After developing a mentor/student relationship with Junípero Serra, they both eagerly joined the Spanish mission system in Alta California. They, along with several other missionaries, reached Veracruz, New Spain in 1749. Palóu worked in New Spain for many in missions such as Sierra Gorda. He was later recalled, along with Serra, to work in the San Saba region of Texas. However, the biggest part of Palóu's journey would not begin until 1767, when he and fourteen other Franciscan friars were sent north to extend their efforts and replace many of the Jesuit missionaries who had been previously expelled from Spain. Much of Palóu's life would be spent in Alta California, and many of his notable endeavors occurred there as well.

=== Alta California missions ===
Palóu and the other friars reached Loreto in Lower California in the spring of 1768. Palou was given control of Mission San Francisco Javier. The following year, Junipero Serra left for Alta California to proceed with the further establishment of missions in that region. This left the office of "president" or superior of all missions in Lower California for Palóu to control until 1773. When the Lower Californian missions were turned over to the Dominican missionaries, Palóu was able to rejoin his brethren and mentor in Upper California. He first went to San Diego, then continued onwards to Mission San Carlos Borromeo de Carmelo (in present-day Carmel), which Serra had been using as his headquarters. Palóu greatly assisted in the placement of friars and recorded historical data, the only surviving account of some aspects of the early California missions.

=== Expeditionary travel and later career ===
In 1774, Palóu accompanied Captain Rivera's expedition to the Bay of San Francisco, and on December 4 planted the cross on a hill he named "Lobos" (wolves), which sits in clear view of the Golden Gate and Pacific Ocean. The name lives on as Lobos Creek, within the Presidio of San Francisco.

The Rivera expedition returned to the Presidio of Monterey via the coastal route first explored by the Portolà expedition of 1769. At the north end of Monterey Bay, Rivera and Palóu inspected the area around today's Santa Cruz, described by friar Juan Crespí (who accompanied Portolà) and recommended by Crespí as a future mission site. Palóu agreed, and on December 9 selected a location where Mission Santa Cruz was later founded by Fermín Lasuén, in 1791.

Palou returned to Lobos in 1776 with the De Anza expedition and, on June 28, offered up the first mass at the future site of Mission Dolores, which Palóu founded but a few weeks later. Palóu remained at the new mission until he was called to give his mentor and close friend, Junípero Serra, his last rites in 1784 at Mission San Carlos.

With Serra's death, Palóu became the acting presidente of the Upper California missions until the formal appointment of Lasuén as successor to Serra. Palou remained at Mission San Carlos until failing health and old age led him to retire in 1785 to the missionary College of San Fernando de Mexico. He was elected guardian of the college and held this office until his death in Mexico, where he had completed his biography of Serra, most of which he had written while still in California.

== Legacy ==
Francisco Palóu played many key roles and offices vital to the establishment of several of the missions in California and many of those in Mexico. He compiled a standard history of the California missions from 1767 to 1784 in his "noticias" as a four-volume set. He also wrote of his teacher, Junípero Serra. Both works provide key information about early California and the missionary system established there.

Palou Avenue, located in San Francisco's Bayview–Hunters Point neighborhood, is named for him.

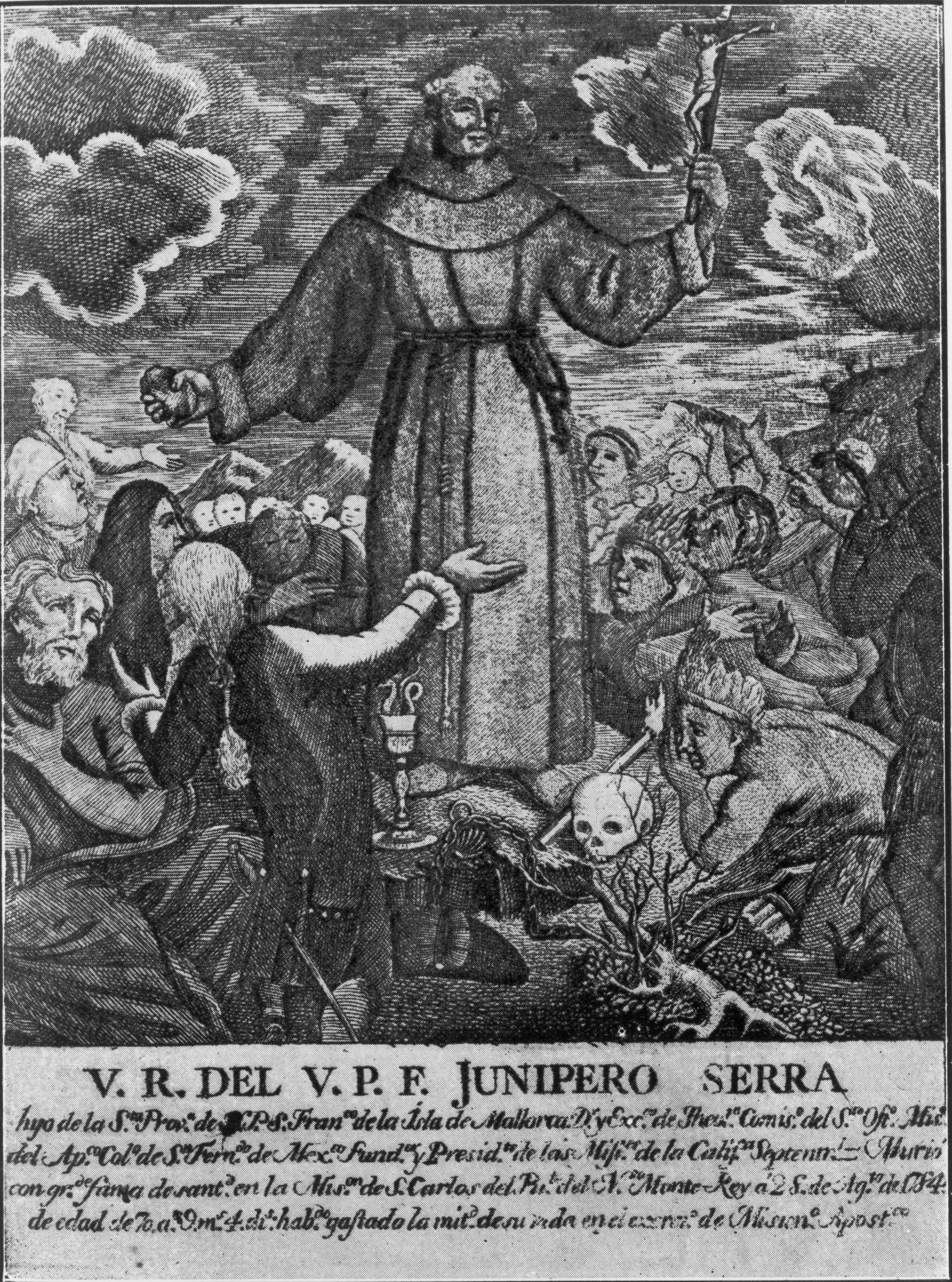
Reproduction of illustration originally published in: Relacion historica de la vida y apostolicas tareas del venerable padre Fray Junipero Serra

== Works ==
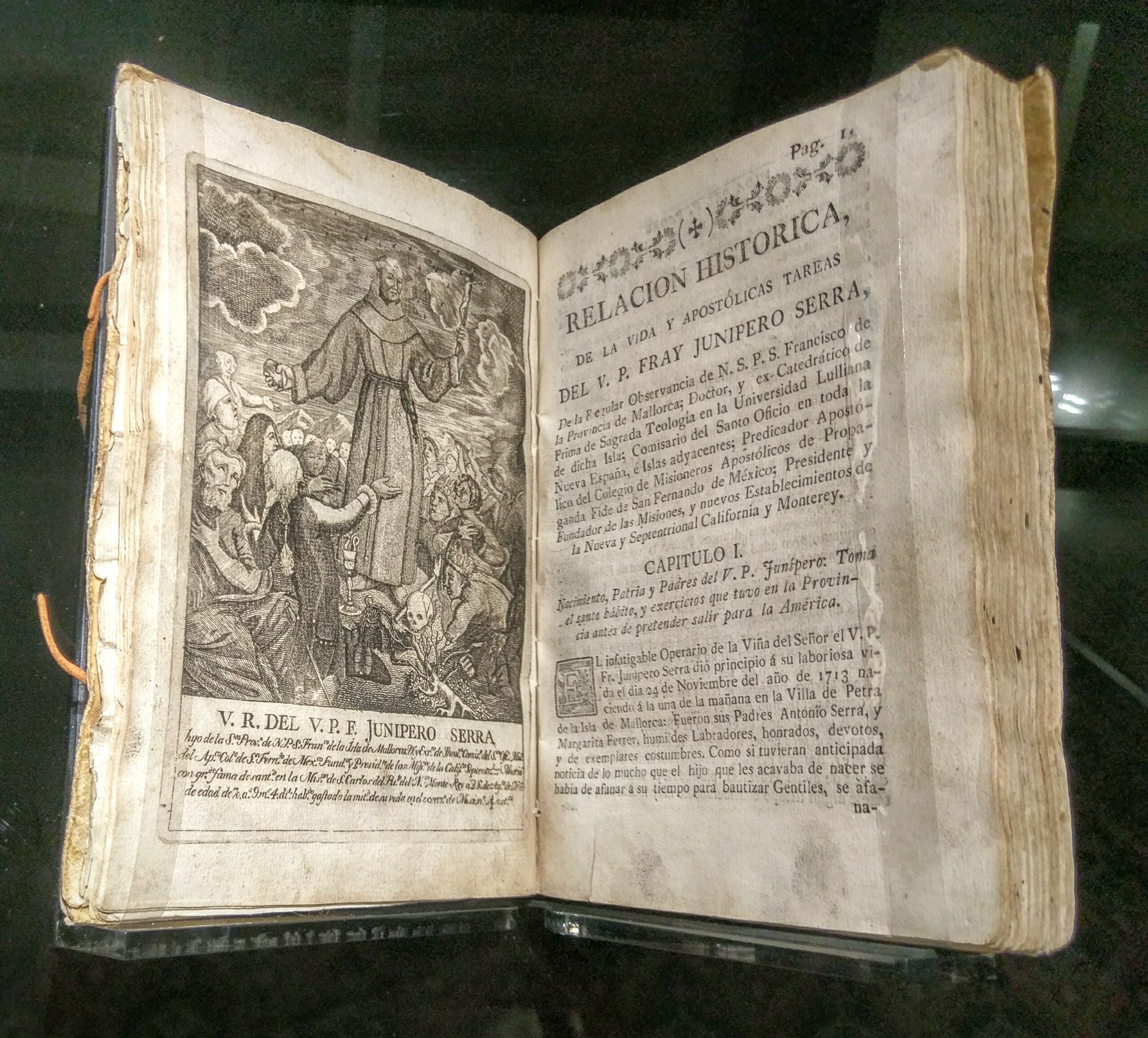
Title pages of the first edition of Palou's biography of Junípero Serra

- Palou, Francisco. 1926. Historical Memoirs of New California. Edited by Herbert E. Bolton. 4 vols. University of California Press, Berkeley.
- Palou, Francisco. 1955. Life of Fray Junípero Serra. Edited by Maynard J. Geiger. Academy of American Franciscan History, Washington, D.C.
- Palou, Francisco. 1994. Cartas desde la península de California (1768-1773). Edited by José Luis Soto Pérez. Editorial Porrúa, Mexico City.
- Palou, Francisco. Noticias de la Nueva California (Volume II). Translated by Miguel Venegas. California: University Microfilms Inc., 1966.

Catholic Church titles
Preceded by Junípero Serra	President-General of the Missions of Alta California; 1784–1785	Succeeded by Fermín Lasuén
