= Presidio of Monterey, California =

US Army military base

Coordinates: 36.6040°N 121.9117°W

Presidio of Monterey
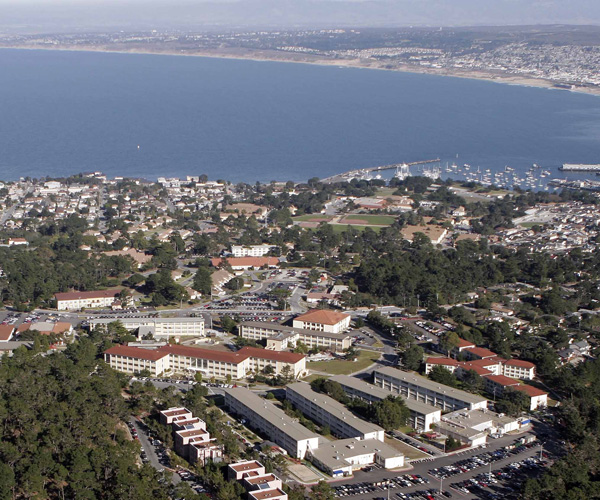
- Presidio of Monterey in 2005.

- Logo of Garrison Command.

Site information
- Type: Military base
- Operator: United States Army

The Presidio of Monterey (POM), located in Monterey, California, is an active US Army installation with historic ties to the Spanish colonial era. It is the home of the Defense Language Institute Foreign Language Center (DLI-FLC). It is the last presidio in California to have an active military installation.

== History ==
The Spanish explorer Sebastián Vizcaíno visited, named and charted Monterey Bay (especially the southern end) in 1602. In his official report, Vizcaíno recommended the natural harbor he found as an appropriate site for a seaport, military fortification and colonization. It would be over 150 years, until news of Pacific Coast moves by Spain's European rivals brought the remote area back to the attention of the leaders of New Spain.

=== José de Gálvez's grand plan ===
In 1768, José de Gálvez, special deputy (visitador) of King Carlos III in New Spain (Mexico), received this order: "Occupy and fortify San Diego and Monterey for God and the King of Spain." Gálvez organized a series of land and sea expeditions from the port of San Blas, today in the state of Nayarit, México, to establish a military post and Catholic mission in Monterey. Spain's rulers had long feared that other European powers would encroach from the north on American territories Spain claimed along the Pacific coast. Gálvez himself spread rumors of schemes by the British and Dutch rulers to add California to their own empires. Then, when a report arrived from the Spanish ambassador in Russia that Catherine the Great planned to establish settlements down the California coast towards Monterey, Gálvez—already planning a northward expansion of New Spain's dominion—trumpeted the threat from Russia. King Carlos gave Gálvez the go-ahead. Spain moved to occupy regions along the Pacific coast of North America that its sailors and soldiers had only seen and claimed from previous maritime explorations.

=== Portolá expeditions to Monterey ===
From March through June 1769, Gaspar de Portolá, appointed "governor of the Californias" (Baja and Alta California), led an overland party—joined by Franciscan friar Junípero Serra—from Loreto to San Diego. Then in July, Portolá mustered a new party—including lieutenant Pedro Fages, cartographer Miguel Costansó, and friars Juan Crespí and Francisco Gómez—to trek north from San Diego to rediscover the port of Monterey by land. They reached Monterey Bay on 1 October, but failed to recognize it as the port described by Vizcaíno 167 years earlier—and continued north, eventually reaching San Francisco Bay. On their return trek to San Diego, they planted two large crosses on the coast of Monterey, whose geographical identity they could not yet confirm. (see Timeline of the Portolá expedition).

In April 1770, Portolá gathered a new and smaller party for another overland journey from San Diego to Monterey. This party included Pedro Fages with twelve Catalan volunteers, seven leather-jacket soldiers, two muleteers, five Christian Indians from Baja California, and friar Juan Crespí. They arrived at Monterey Bay on 24 May. That afternoon, Portolá and Crespí revisited the large wooden cross their party had planted five months earlier on a hill just south of Point Pinos near the northern tip of the Monterey peninsula. "This is the port of Monterey without the slightest doubt," wrote Crespí in his diary.

=== Strict discipline to build Spanish presidio ===
Miguel Costansó selected the site of the presidio and drew the first plans and maps. Pedro Fages, left in command of the Monterey soldiers after Portolá sailed back to Mexico, imposed strict discipline on his soldiers to construct the presidio. He set the work they had to do in a certain time, harshly punishing soldiers caught resting or rolling a cigarette. Heavy rains punctuated the spring and winter of 1770–1771, but Fages permitted no let-up in the work. His soldiers had to trudge through mud to the forest to chop wood, then drag their mules out of the mud and head home. They had no chance to wash or mend their clothes during the six-day work week; Fages told them to do that on Sundays. This work regime lasted a year and a half, until complaints by the soldiers persuaded padre president Junípero Serra to intervene: Serra told Fages that, as a Christian, he had to observe the sabbath and let men rest on Sundays. In late June 1771, Fages wrote to viceroy Carlos de Croix in Mexico to inform him that the Monterey presidio had been built, sending along a simplified map.

=== Spanish Fort ===
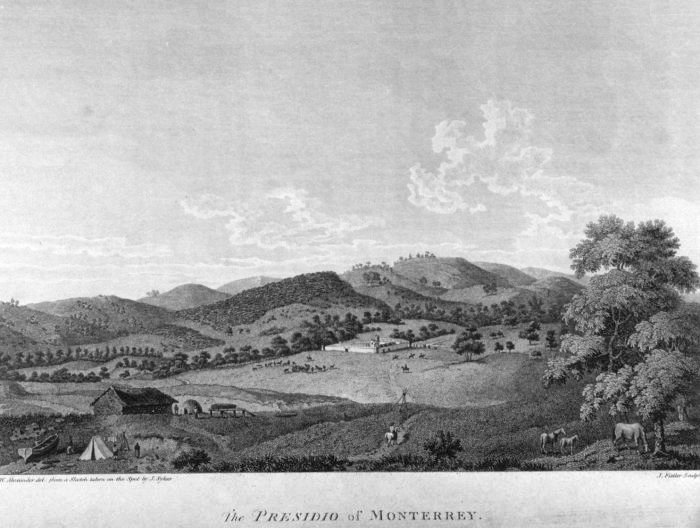
"The Presidio of Monterrey". Volume II, plate V from: "A Voyage of Discovery to the North Pacific Ocean and Round the World" by Captain George Vancouver

While Fages established El Presidio Real de San Carlos de Monterrey (the Royal Presidio of Saint Charles of Monterey), Junípero Serra founded Mission San Carlos Borromeo de Carmelo, with the original location occupying the present day (remaining) chapel Cathedral of San Carlos Borromeo.

Monterey became one of a series of presidios, or "royal forts," built by Spain in what is now the western United States. In 1792, the El Castillo de Monterey was established to protect the port and persido of Monterey. Other California-based installations were founded in San Diego (El Presidio Real de San Diego) in 1769, in San Francisco (El Presidio Real de San Francisco ) in 1776, and in Santa Barbara (El Presidio Real de Santa Bárbara) in 1782.

=== Argentine raid and occupation ===
On 20 November 1818, Argentine privateer Hipólito Bouchard, known thereafter as "California's only pirate", raided the El Castillo de Monterey defended by José Bandini. Its population took refuge in the Presidio's Rancho del Rey San Pedro (King's Farm), in the vicinity of Salinas. The fortunes of the Presidio at Monterey rose and fell with the times: it has been moved, abandoned and reactivated time and time again. The only surviving building from the original compound is the Royal Presidio Chapel. At least three times, it has been submerged by the tide of history, only to appear years later with a new face, a new master, and a new mission – first under the Spanish, then the Mexicans, and ultimately the Americans.

=== United States fort ===
United States control of the area began in 1846 during the Mexican–American War when Commodore John D. Sloat, commander of the U.S. Navy's Pacific Squadron, landed unopposed a small force in Monterey and claimed the territory and the Presidio for the United States. He left a small garrison of Marines who moved the fort up to its current location on the hill overlooking the harbor, combining in one location the previously separated functions of military headquarters and fortress. The Presidio was renamed Fort Mervine in honor of Captain William Mervine, who commanded one of the ships in Sloat's squadron.

The original Presidio comprised a square of adobe buildings located in the vicinity of what is now downtown Monterey. The fort's original mission, the Royal Presidio Chapel, has remained in constant use since its founding in 1770 by Junípero Serra, who arrived with Portola's party. On a hill overlooking the Monterey harbor is an earthwork—the only lingering connection between the original and present sites of the Presidio. That earthwork was part of the Spanish-built artillery battery defending the harbor.

The 1846 US occupation of Monterey put an end to any Mexican military presence at the Presidio. In 1865, in the closing months of the American Civil War, the fort was returned to temporary life by the arrival of six officers and 156 enlisted men, but was abandoned again in 1866.

In 1902, an infantry regiment arrived at Monterey with the mission to construct a post to house an infantry regiment and a squadron of cavalry. Troops moved into the new wooden barracks, officially named Ord Barracks, in June 1903. It was named for former American Civil War general, Edward Ord. However, in order to perpetuate the name of the old Spanish military installation that Portolà had established 134 years earlier, the War Department redesignated the post as the Presidio of Monterey. The barracks and training facilities for enlisted men, along with General Ord's name, were moved a short way up the coast to Fort Ord in 1940.

=== Presidio of Monterey ===
A school of musketry was located at the Presidio from 1907 to 1913, and a school for cooks and bakers from 1914 to 1917. In 1917, the Army purchased an additional 15,809 acres (64 km^{2}) across the bay as a maneuver area. This new acquisition eventually was designated as Camp Ord in 1939 and became Fort Ord in 1940.

Between 1919 and 1940, the Presidio housed principally cavalry and field artillery units. However, the outbreak of World War II ended the days of horse cavalry, and those troops left Monterey. The Presidio, subsequently, served as reception center and temporary headquarters of the III Corps until it was deactivated in late 1944.

=== Civil Affairs Staging Area ===
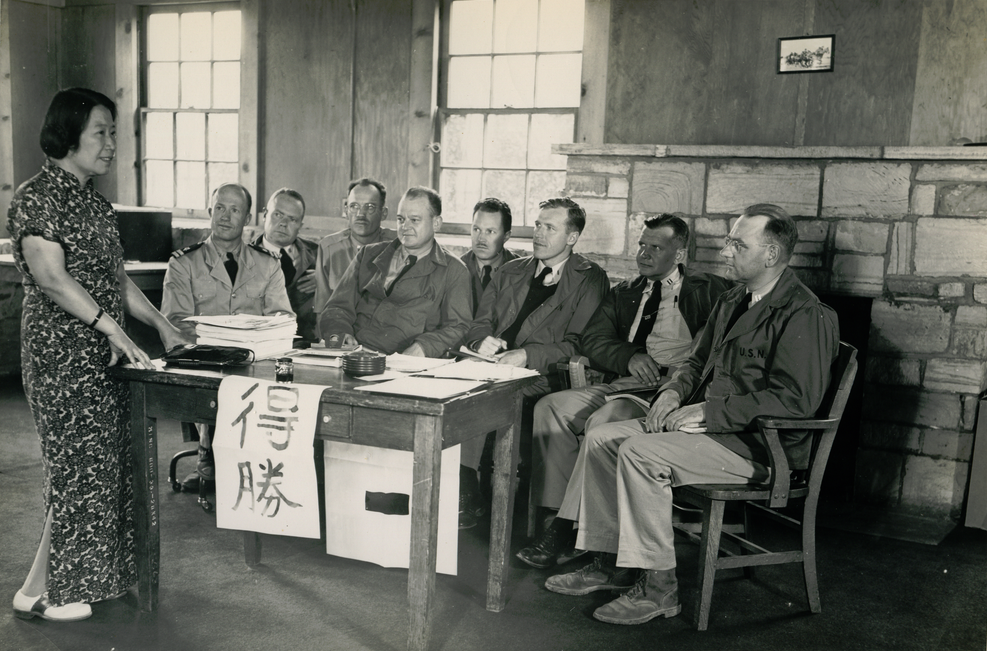
Civil Affairs Staging Area (CASA) officers receive Chinese language instruction at the Presidio of Monterey in the Spring of 1945.

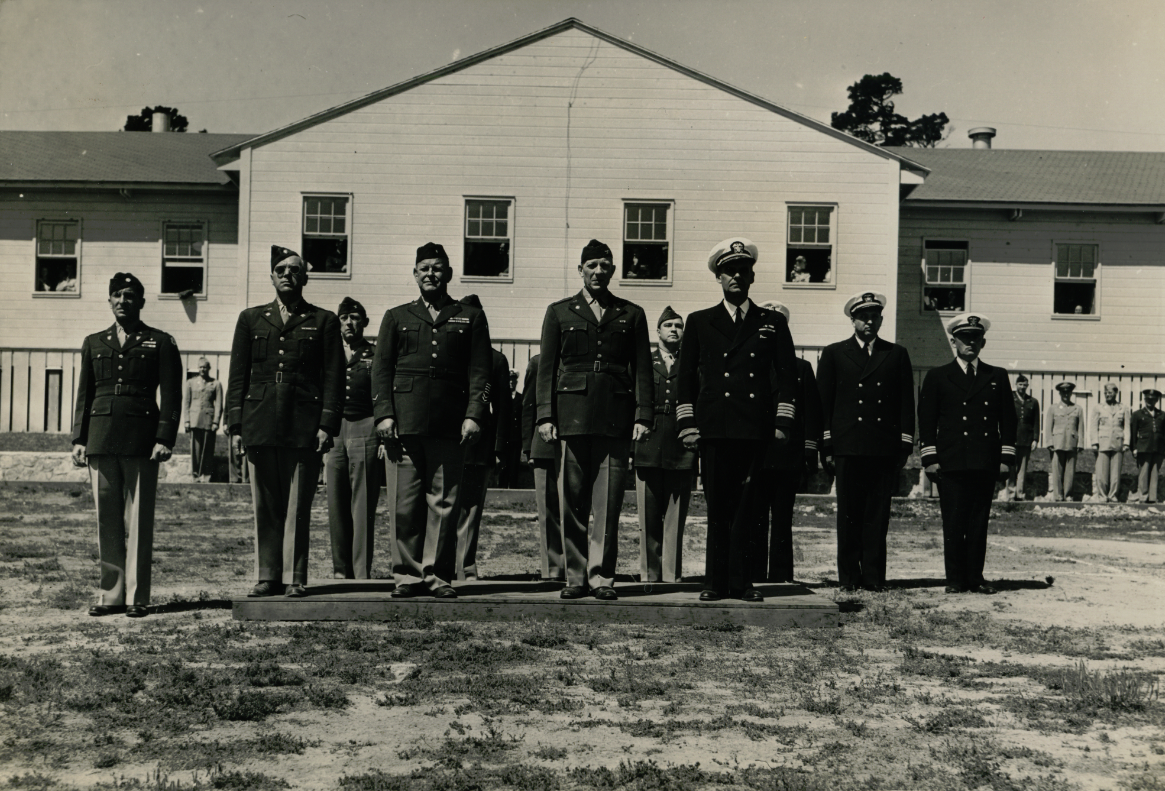
Senior Army / Navy Civil Affairs Staging Area officers at the Presidio of Monterey in the Spring of 1945.

The Presidio of Monterey was reactivated, under considerable difficulty, in January 1945 to accommodate the Civil Affairs Staging Area (CASA). The Civil Affairs Staging Area was a brigade sized Army / Navy formation created by a joint chiefs of staff directive for military government theater planning, training and provision of military government personnel to liberated areas of the Far East. CASA provided comprehensive training and planning in civil affairs administration to officers coming from six schools of military government established at various universities throughout the country.

=== Defense Language Institute ===
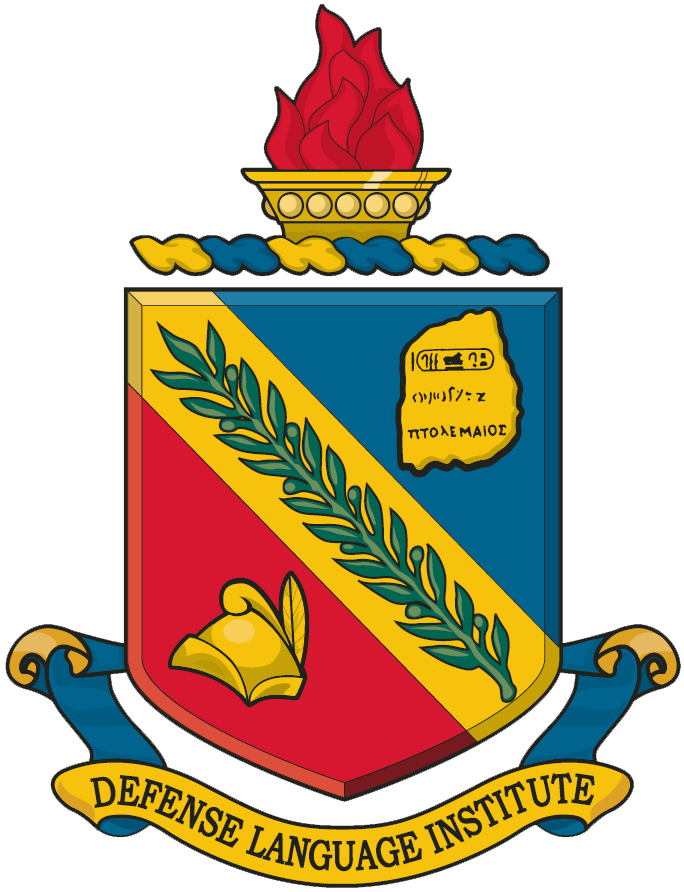

In 1946, the Military Intelligence Service Language School (MISLS) was moved to the Presidio of Monterey and was renamed the Army Language School (ALS). In June 1963, the Army Language School was renamed the Defense Language Institute (DLI). In 1976, the Defense Language Institute became the Defense Language Institute Foreign Language Center (DLI-FLC), the Defense Department's primary center for foreign language instruction. The center constitutes the principal activity at the Presidio. The Presidio serves all branches of the Department of Defense as well as other select government agencies.

=== Closure of Fort Ord ===
From 1946 onward, the Presidio itself was a sub-installation of the nearby Fort Ord. On 1 October 1994, this situation changed when Fort Ord closed and the Presidio of Monterey became a separate installation again, with the continued military areas of Fort Ord becoming known as the Presidio Annex.

== Tenants ==
- Installation Management Command
- Defense Language Institute Foreign Language Center
- 229th Military Intelligence Battalion, United States Army Training and Doctrine Command
- MARDET Presidio of Monterey, Marine Corps Communication Electronics School
- Information Warfare Training Command Monterey, Center for Information Warfare Training
- 517th Training Group, 17th Training Wing
- 902nd Monterey Field Office, C Company 308th Military Intelligence (MI) Battalion, 902nd MI Group
- California Medical Detachment, Madigan Army Medical Center
  - Presidio of Monterey Dental Clinic
- Criminal Investigation Command
- Logistics Readiness Center, Army Materiel Command
- Mission Installation Contracting Command
- Network Enterprise Center, Army Network Enterprise Technology Command

== Camp Roberts ==
US Army Signal Activity (USASA) Camp Roberts, California is a subinstallation of the Presidio of Monterey.

== See also ==
- Presidio Military Districts in Spanish California
  - Presidio of Sonoma
- Naval Postgraduate School
- Bibliography of California history
