= Modjeska (name) =

Modjeska is both a surname and a given name. Notable people with the name include:

- Drusilla Modjeska (born 1946), Australian writer and editor
- Helena Modjeska (1840–1909), Polish-American actress
- Modjeska Monteith Simkins (1899–1992), African-American activist
