= Portolá expedition =

Exploration of the present-day state of California, United States, 1769–1770

Portolá expedition Spanish: Expedición de Portolá
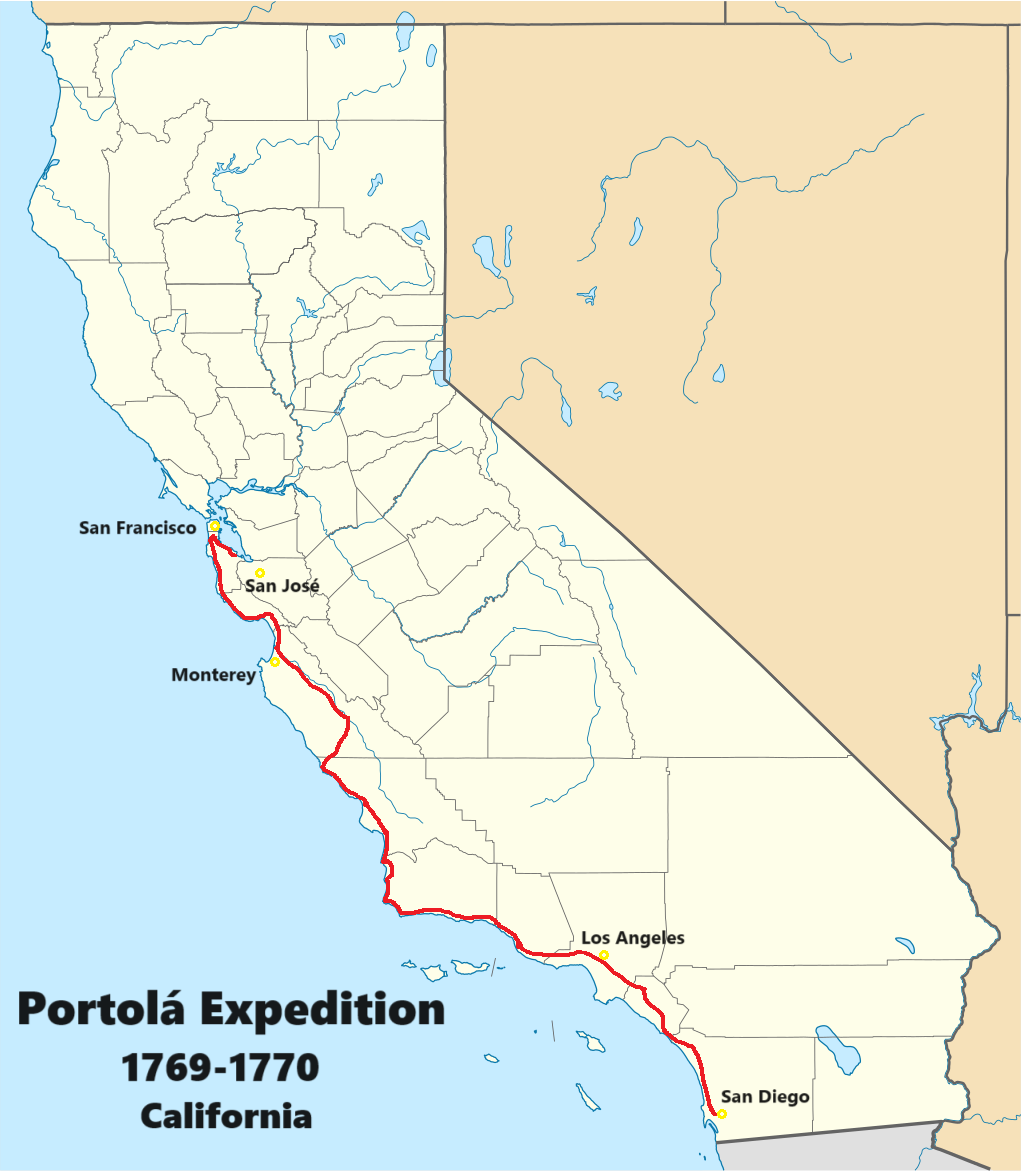
- Route of expedition with modern borders
- Date: July 14, 1769 – January 24, 1770
- Duration: 195 days
- Motive: Survey Alta California and assert the Spanish Crown's land claims
- Organized by: José de Gálvez, 1st Marquess of Sonora
- Participants: 74 men, including Gaspar de Portolá, Junípero Serra, the Free Company of Volunteers of Catalonia, and Franciscan missionaries

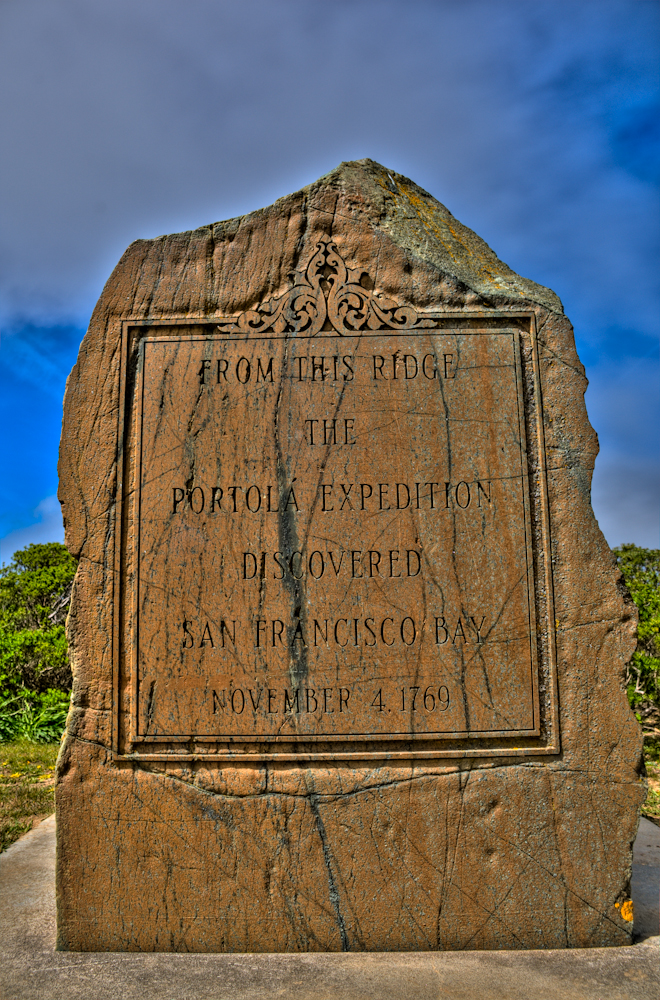
Point of San Francisco Bay Discovery

The Portolá expedition was a Spanish voyage of exploration in 1769–1770 that was the first recorded European exploration of the interior of the present-day California. It was led by Gaspar de Portolá, governor of Las Californias, the Spanish colonial province that included California, Baja California, and other parts of present-day Mexico and the United States. The expedition led to the founding of Alta California and contributed to the solidification of Spanish territorial claims in the disputed and unexplored regions along the Pacific coast of North America.

== Background ==
Although already inhabited by Native Americans, the territory that is now California was claimed by the Spanish Empire in 1542 by right of discovery when Juan Rodríguez Cabrillo explored the Pacific coast. Cabrillo's exploration laid claim to the coastline as far north as forty-two degrees north latitude. This northern limit was later confirmed by the United States in the 1819 Adams–Onís Treaty.

A competing claim was established for England in 1579 by the privateer Francis Drake, who followed the trans-Pacific route from the Philippines established by the Manila galleons and reached the California coast near Cape Mendocino, from which he then sailed south along the coast at least as far as Point Reyes. In 1596, a Portuguese captain sailing for Spain, Sebastião Rodrigues Soromenho (Spanish: Sebastián Rodríguez Cermeño) explored some of the same coastline, leaving a description of coastal features. The Portolà expedition carried a copy of Soromenho's writings to guide them along the coast.

Soromenho was followed in 1602 by Sebastián Vizcaíno, whose coastal explorations in 1602 surveyed several California locations for future colonization, including San Diego, the California Channel Islands and Monterey. Vizcaíno sailed north from Mexico (as Cabrillo had done), a much more difficult undertaking because of the prevailing winds and ocean currents. After Vizcaíno, however, the Spanish Empire did little to protect or settle this region for the next 160 years, and accomplished almost no exploration by land. Affairs in Europe took precedence, keeping all of the maritime powers occupied. The little settlement that did occur included the establishment of several missions on the Baja California peninsula by Spanish Jesuit missionaries.

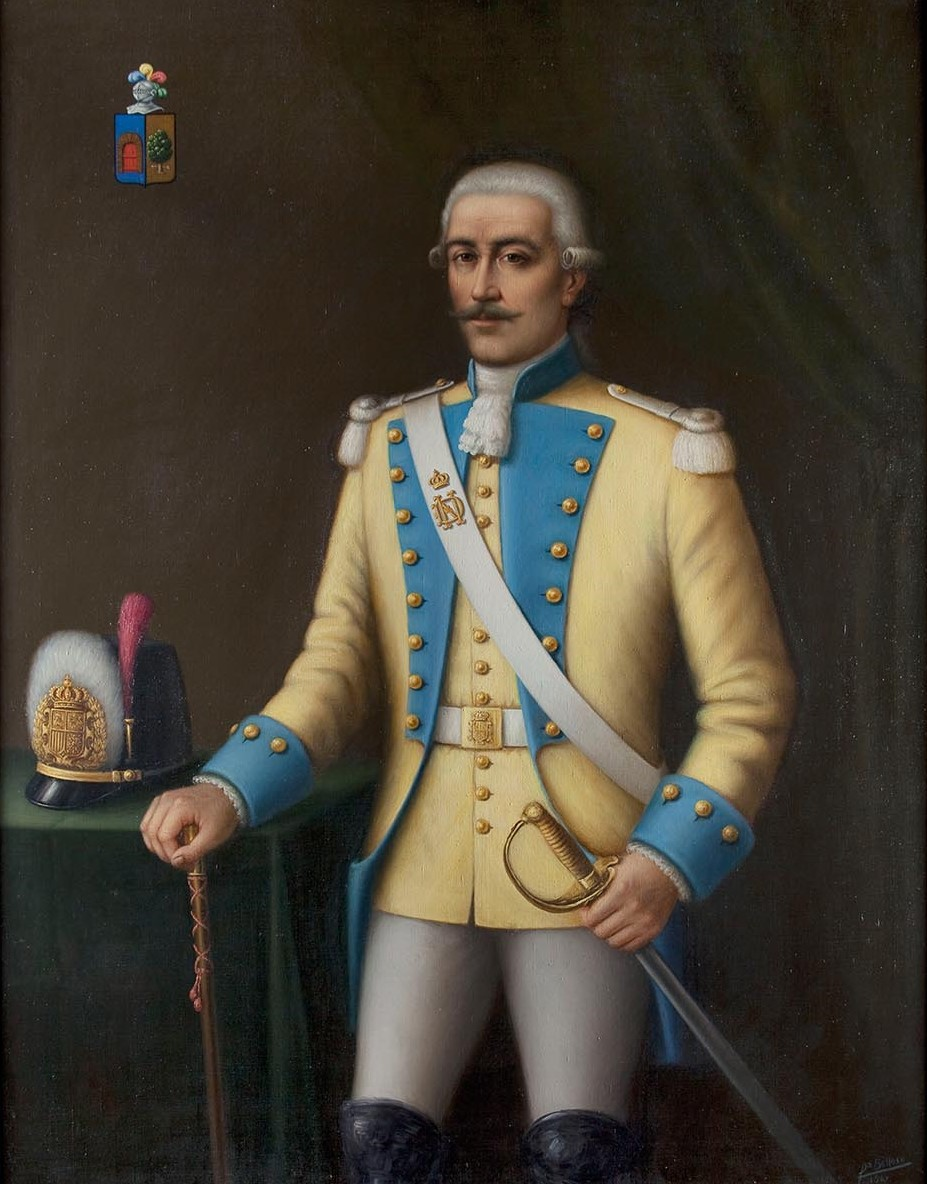
Gaspar de Portolà i Rovira

Then, in 1767, Charles III of Spain expelled the Jesuit order from the Spanish kingdom. Gaspar de Portolà, a Catalan military officer and colonial administrator, was appointed governor of the new province of Las Californias and sent to dispossess the Jesuits and replace them with Franciscans, who would set up their own network of missions in the colony. Gaspar came from a military background and had served as a captain of the dragoons of the Regiment of Spain immediately before being appointed governor. When he first sailed to Baja California as the new governor he brought with him 25 dragoons and 25 infantrymen in order to help him with his expulsion of the Jesuits and, eventually, the further exploration of the rest of California. His military background would prove very helpful during the expedition.

=== Decision to send an expedition ===
By the late 1760s, the Spanish king and a handful of other European rulers began to realize the importance the Pacific coast of North America would have in maritime trade and activity. The Russians had been advancing south from their strongholds in present-day Alaska, and the British had been pushing west in Canada and were approaching the Pacific coast. In order to secure Spain's claims in California, Charles III wanted to explore and settle the coastline so that he could create a buffer zone to protect Spain's territories from the threat of invasion.

Upon hearing about the king's desire to explore Alta California, New Spain's visitador (inspector general) José de Gálvez organized an exploratory expedition and placed Governor Portolà in overall command. The plan called for a joint land-sea movement up the Pacific coast. The job of the ships was to keep the land contingent supplied with provisions and to carry communications between them and New Spain. Portolà decided to travel by land.

The expedition's original assignment was to travel to the "port of Monterey" described by Vizcaíno and establish a settlement there. After that, the explorers were to continue north to locate Soromenho's "Bay of San Francisco", chase away any Russians encountered, claim the area for Spain and determine whether the bay would make a good port.

== Expedition ==
=== Baja California to San Diego ===
The first leg of the expedition consisted of five groups all departing from Baja California and heading north for San Diego. Three groups traveled by sea while two others traveled by land in mule trains. Three galleons, hastily built in San Blas, set sail for San Diego in early 1769: the San Carlos, captained by Vicente Vila, a lieutenant of the royal navy (whose diary survives); the San Antonio, captained by Juan Pérez, a native of Palma de Majorca; and the San José. All three ships, crossing the Gulf of California from San Blas, arrived leaking on the east coast of Baja, requiring repairs there.

==== Three groups by sea ====
On the shore of La Paz on January 9, 1769, friar Junípero Serra blessed the flagship San Carlos and its chaplain, friar Fernando Parrón. José de Gálvez, addressing the men waiting to board, declared their final destination as Monterey and their mission to plant the holy cross among the Indians. Friar Parrón boarded the San Carlos along with captain Vicente Vila, followed by lieutenant Pedro Fages with his 25 Catalan volunteers; cartographer Miguel Costansó, who made maps and drawings to describe the journey; surgeon Pedro Prat; and a crew of 23 sailors, plus two blacksmiths, two boys, four cooks, and mate Jorge Estorace – a crew of 62 in all. Weighing anchor, the San Carlos headed south down the Gulf of California to round Cabo San Lucas and then head north along the Pacific coast.

On February 15, Gálvez dispatched the San Antonio, captained by Juan Pérez, from Cabo San Lucas; Franciscan friars Juan Vizcaíno and Francisco Gómez served as chaplains. With sailors plus cooks, carpenters and blacksmiths, the San Antonio carried a total of around 30 men. These ships left ahead of the land groups. The San Carlos and San Antonio were followed by an additional supply ship, the San José, which was named after the patron saint of the Portolà expedition, Saint Joseph. The San José never reached San Diego and was presumed lost at sea.

==== Two groups by land ====
Captain Fernando Rivera, moving north through Baja California, gathered horses and mules from the fragile chain of Catholic missions to supply his overland expedition. José de Gálvez had ordered Rivera to requisition horses and mules from the missions without endangering their survival and to give the friars receipts for the number of animals taken; those missions would later get restocked with animals brought over from the Mexican mainland. Friar Juan Crespí, selected as chaplain for the Rivera party and diarist for the Franciscan missionaries, traveled for 24 days from Mission La Purísima, approximately 400 miles (640 km) north to Velicatá, then the northern frontier of Spanish settlement in Baja California. There Crespí met up with the Rivera party, which set out from Velicatá on March 24.

Portolà himself led the second land group, which set out from Loreto on March 9. Junípero Serra, assigned by José de Gálvez to head the Franciscan missionary team into Alta California, joined the Portolà party as chaplain and diarist. The 55-year-old Serra suffered a chronic infection of his left foot and leg, which Portolà believed had now become cancerous. He tried to dissuade Serra from joining the expedition, but Serra refused to withdraw; he told Portolà to go ahead, saying he would follow and meet up with Portolà on the frontier. Meanwhile, Serra assigned friar Miguel de la Campa from Mission San Ignacio to join the Portolà party. The party, driving a supply train and food animals, included 25 leather-jacket soldiers under sergeant José Francisco Ortega; muleteers; artisans; and 44 Christian Indians from Baja California, acting as servants and interpreters to communicate with Indians along the way. This group traveled slower than the Rivera party. Serra, trekking much of the way on a broken-down mule, finally caught up with Portolà, De la Campa and the other members of their party on May 5, just south of Velicatá. Following the trail blazed by the Rivera party, and less burdened by livestock, the Portolà party moved somewhat faster. Even so, they had an arduous trek over deserts and through ravines.

==== Arrival in San Diego ====
The ships arrived in San Diego first: the San Antonio on April 11 and the San Carlos on April 29, 1769. Many crew members on both ships had fallen ill – especially from scurvy – during their voyages. On May 1, lieutenant Pedro Fages, engineer Miguel Costansó, and mate Jorge Estorace came ashore from their anchorage in San Diego Bay, along with 25 soldiers and sailors still healthy enough to work. Searching for a source of fresh water and helped by Indians they encountered, they found a suitable river about nine miles northeast. Moving their ships as close as possible, they set up a camp on the beach, surrounding it with an earthen parapet with two cannons mounted. From their ships' sails and awnings they made two large hospital tents, as well as tents for the officers and friars. Then they moved the sick men to shore and settled them into the camp. The number of men engaged in those arduous labors diminished daily due to illness. Nearly all medicines and stored food had been consumed on the long voyages. Doctor Pedro Prat – himself weakened by scurvy – gathered medicinal herbs in the fields and desperately tried to cure the ill men. Heat scorched them by day, cold stung them by night. Two or three men died every day, until the combined sea expedition – which had started with over 90 men – had shrunk to eight soldiers and eight sailors.

Captain Rivera's column arrived on May 14, having trekked 300 miles (480 km) in 50 days from Velicatá without losing a single man or having a sick one – although with their food rations drastically reduced. Rivera's men moved the camp slightly inland near the San Diego River, building the new camp on a hill now known as Old Town. They erected a stockade and mounted a cannon on land that later became the Presidio of San Diego.

The commanding officers prepared to dispatch the San Antonio back to Lower California New Spain, to report to viceroy de Croix and visitador Gálvez about the expedition. On July 1, just as the ship was about to sail, the Portolá/Serra party arrived in San Diego in good health, with 163 mules loaded with supplies. Desiring to push the sea expedition north to Monterey – as Gálvez had instructed – Portolá offered captain Vicente Vila of the San Carlos 16 of his own men to work the ship on its voyage to Monterey. But Vila had lost all his ship's officers, his boatswain, coxswain of the launch and storekeeper – and none of the men offered by Portolá had experience as sailors. Vila refused to sail under such conditions. So Portolá decided to place all available sailors aboard the San Antonio, which set out for San Blas on July 9, with a very small crew. Carrying important letters from Serra, Portolá and others, the San Antonio reached San Blas in just three weeks. On that voyage, several more sailors died.

After the four groups had reunited in San Diego, friars Juan Vizcaíno and Fernando Parrón stayed there with Junípero Serra to head the new mission San Diego. Friars Juan Crespí and Francisco Gómez continued north with Portolá. Serra's group aimed to establish Catholic missions to convert the natives of Alta California to Christianity. Crespí was the only one who traveled with the land expedition throughout its travels, so he became the official diarist for the missionaries (Portolá and Costansó also kept diaries). The Franciscans ultimately founded twenty-one missions at or near the Pacific Coast of what is now the state of California, in addition to one mission in Baja California. The string of California missions began at San Diego.

=== San Diego to San Francisco, flummoxed at Monterey (1769) ===
After two weeks of recuperation, Portolà resumed the northward march to rediscover Vizcaíno's port of Monterey by land, with a party of 74 men: lieutenant Pedro Fages with his Catalan volunteers; leather-jacket soldiers; captain Fernando Rivera; sergeant José Francisco Ortega leading the scouts; engineer and cartographer Miguel Costansó; Baja California Christian Indians; and friars Juan Crespí and Francisco Gómez; the Franciscan missionary college of San Fernando had appointed Crespí official diarist of the expedition. On July 14, 1769, after the friars held a Mass in honor of saint Joseph – patron saint of the Portolá expedition – the Portolá party pulled out of San Diego. Serra stayed behind, as did captain Vicente Vila and the few sailors who remained on the San Carlos. Serra founded mission San Diego in a humble building just two days after the expedition's departure. While Portolà moved north, more men died in San Diego: Eight soldiers, four sailors, eight Christian Indians, and one servant perished by the time the Portolà party returned six months later.

==== Earthquakes around future Los Angeles ====
On July 28, the Portolà party reached a major southern California river, which the soldiers called the Santa Ana River. That afternoon they felt a strong earthquake, with aftershocks jolting them over the next few days. On August 2 they traveled west out of San Gabriel Valley, through the hills to a river Crespí named El Río de Nuestra Señora la Reina de los Ángeles de Porciúncula – site of the future pueblo of Los Angeles. They continued moving northwest along a route that would become El Camino Real (royal path or road) in New Spain.

==== Monterey Bay hidden in plain sight ====
On September 30, as the party camped by a river just south of today's Salinas, scouts ranged west to the coast. They reached Monterey Bay but failed to recognize it as the port described by Vizcaíno 167 years earlier. The rest of the party reached Monterey Bay on October 1 – but still failed to recognize it as their destination, because it did not seem to match the grand scale described by Vizcaíno. Also, Portolà and his hungry men had hoped to find the supply ship San José waiting for them at anchor in their destination harbor of Monterey. They never saw the San José, apparently lost at sea.

Its morale waning, the party resumed its march on October 7, reaching the area of Espinosa Lake east of today's Castroville. By then, at least ten of the party were being carried on litters, due to the effects of scurvy.

==== Rounding San Francisco Bay ====
Portolà and his men continued north along the coast, hoping to find the great port they had now left behind. On October 30, they reached the headlands near today's Moss Beach. Looking into the Pacific Ocean, they could see the Farallon Islands due west – and Drakes Bay curving broadly to Point Reyes across 40 miles (65 km) of open water to the northwest. Drake's Bay had been named the "port of San Francisco" by previous European explorers, while what is today known as "San Francisco Bay" was still undiscovered. The sight convinced some, but not all of them that they had indeed bypassed the port of Monterey.

Sergeant Ortega, contacting a group of Indians, thought they were trying to notify him of a ship anchored somewhere up north; for weeks, the men of the expedition had sought desperately for a harbor with a ship laden with food supplies. Heading a party of scouts up and over Montara Mountain, Ortega reached the area now known as Devil's Slide. They found their northward advance blocked by the mouth of a vast bay they could not identify – known today as San Francisco Bay. Ortega and his scouts turned back south along the west shore of the bay, around the southern end and back up the east side. However, they only got as far as present-day Hayward before turning back – because their allotted three days were up. When the scouts returned and described what they had seen, Portolà led the entire party up into the hills, to a place where the entire San Francisco Bay was visible. Only friar Crespí seemed to grasp the importance of the bay, describing it in his diary as "a very large and fine harbor, such that not only all the navy of our Most Catholic Majesty but those of all Europe could take shelter in it."

=== Return trip ===
On November 11, Portolà convened an officers' council, which agreed unanimously that 1) they must have passed Monterey, 2) it was time to turn around and retrace their steps back to San Diego, and 3) no one would be left behind hoping for a supply ship to arrive. The entire party headed back south.

On November 28, the party crossed the Monterey Peninsula south to Carmel Bay. A week later, while waiting for two Baja Christian Indians who got separated from Rivera's group, the expedition leaders discussed their next moves. They still did not believe they had found Vizcaíno's port of Monterey. On December 7, they decided to return to San Diego without waiting any longer for the missing men, or for a supply ship. On December 10, Portolà ordered his men to plant a large wooden cross where passing ships could see it, with a letter describing the expedition's travels buried at its foot. Crespí quoted part of the letter: "The cross was planted on a hill on the edge of the beach of the little bay which lies to the south of Point Pinos (pine-covered headland)."

Frustrated in their hunting and fishing efforts, men of the expedition had to eat seagulls and pelicans. On November 30, about a dozen Indians from the interior – apparently Rumsen people – visited, bringing pinole and seeds. The next day the party slaughtered a mule, but not everyone would eat it. The weather turned cold, and snow began to cover the hills.

The exhausted men reached San Diego on January 24, 1770 "smelling frightfully of mules", but warmly welcomed by their fellow soldiers and friars. Apart from five men who had apparently deserted, every member of the party had survived their six-month journey. They told of large numbers of friendly Indians who lived along the coast, waiting to receive the Catholic gospel. In total they had traveled around 1,200 miles (1,900 km) and become the first Europeans to survey San Francisco Bay and many other important strategic locations. Yet friar Junípero Serra, who welcomed them back to San Diego, felt dismayed and incredulous that they had not found Monterey Bay. "You come from Rome without having seen the pope", Serra told Portolà.

=== San Diego to Monterey (1770) ===
A second expedition to find Monterey Bay and establish a permanent settlement there took place in 1770. Portolà mustered a new overland party in San Diego, consisting of less than half the number of men he had taken on his first trip to find Monterey. The new party included Pedro Fages with twelve Catalan volunteers, seven leather-jacket soldiers, two muleteers, five Baja Christian Indians, Portolà's servant, and friar Crespí. Rivera had traveled back to Baja California to get supplies. On April 17, the Portolà party left San Diego. Following the same route they had taken the year before, they traveled five weeks with only two days of rest, arriving at Monterey Bay on May 24. They did not lose a single man or suffer any illnesses, except for an eye infection that afflicted Fages and Crespí.

That afternoon, Portolà, Crespí and a guard walked over the hills to Point Pinos on the northern tip of the Monterey peninsula, then just south to a hill by the beach where their party had planted a large cross the previous December. They found the cross surrounded by feathers and broken arrows driven into the ground, with fresh sardines and meat laid out before the cross. No Indians were in sight. In the bay waters, hundreds of seals and sea otters splashed and basked in the sun. Crespí wrote: "This is the port of Monterey without the slightest doubt." The three men then walked along the rocky coast south to Carmel Bay. Several Indians approached them, and the two groups exchanged gifts.

Meanwhile, on April 16, the San Antonio, captained by Juan Pérez, set sail from San Diego to Monterey. On board were friar Junípero Serra, cartographer Miguel Costansó, and doctor Pedro Prat – along with a stock of supplies for the new mission in Monterey. Buffeted by unfavorable winds, the San Antonio retreated back south to Baja California, then swung as far north as the Farallon Islands, 100 miles (160 km) northwest of Monterey. Several sailors fell sick with scurvy. The San Antonio finally sailed into Monterey Bay on May 31, welcomed by the Portolà party which had arrived a week earlier.

They returned to the wooden cross left on a hill the year before, and this time (perhaps on a clearer day) realized that the site did indeed overlook the place Vizcaíno had described. Portolà founded the Presidio of Monterey on that hill, and Serra founded the Mission San Carlos Borromeo (moved to Carmel the next year, a little ways to the south). On July 9, 1770, Portolà and Costansó boarded the San Antonio and sailed out of Monterey Bay, headed back to Baja California New Spain.

== Interactions with Native Americans ==
For the most part, it was reported that interactions with Native American tribes in Alta California were peaceful without much conflict. Many were described as welcoming and helpful, as they offered guidance and supplies to the Spanish explorers. Friendly encounters with the native people had been a goal from the onset of the expedition, and the Spanish brought many items and trinkets which they traded for supplies and used to create peaceful relations. They used valuable space to carry so many glass beads and other items, rather than food or more crucial supplies, in order to pacify the Native Americans, indicating that they were committed to creating peaceful relationships with the native people. The long-term goal was to create settlements, introduce farming, and convert the inhabitants to Christianity, so peaceful coexistence was important during the expedition.

== Legacy ==
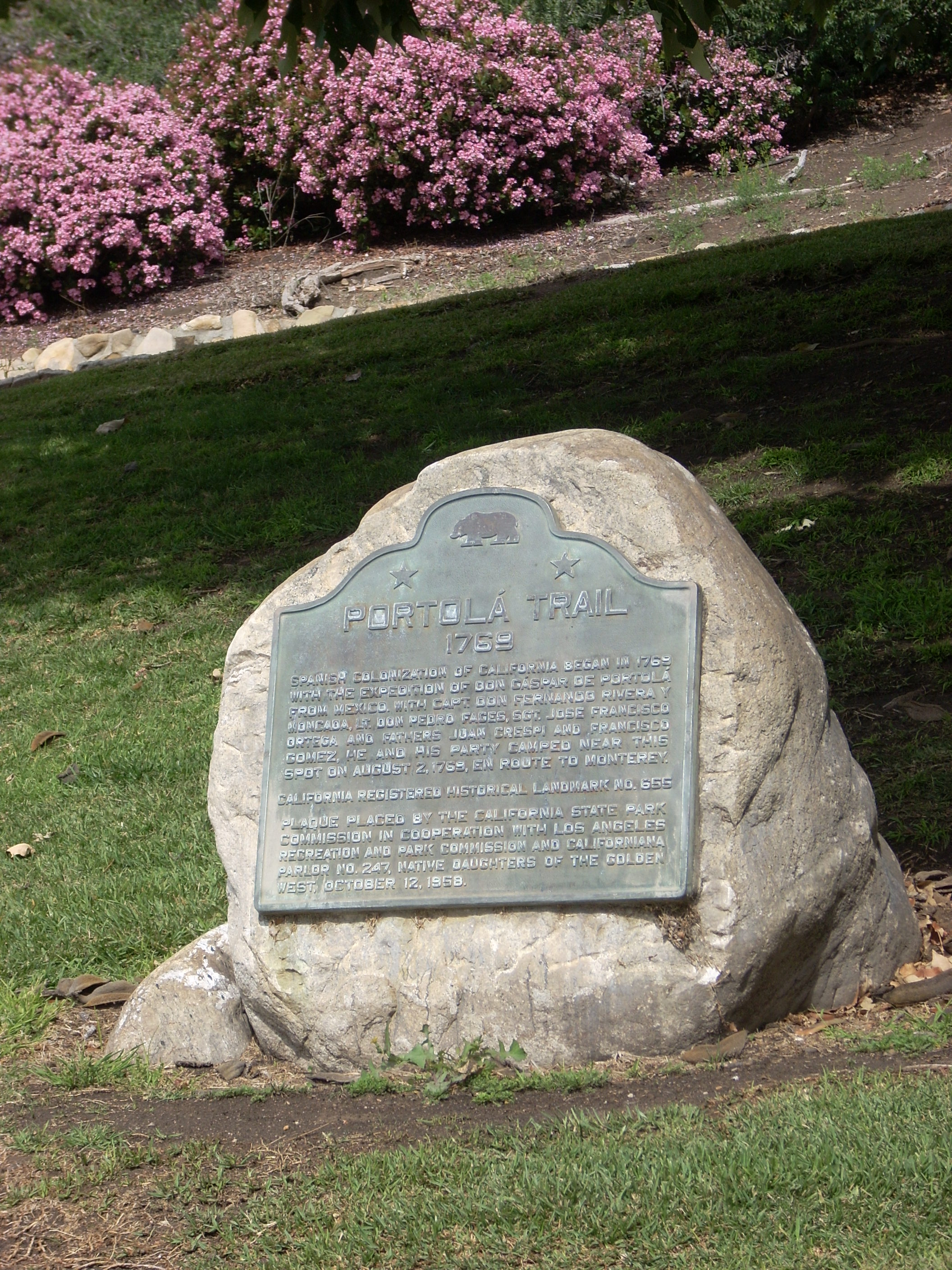
Portolá Trail historic plaque on rock in Elysian Park in Los Angeles, near the North Broadway-Buena Vista St. Bridge (CHL 655)

The Portolà expedition was the first land-based exploration by Europeans of what is now California. The expedition's most notable discovery was San Francisco Bay, but nearly every stop along the route was a first. It is also important in that it, along with the later de Anza expedition, established the overland route north to San Francisco which became the Camino Real. That route was integral to the settlement of Alta California by the Spanish Empire, and made it possible for the Franciscan friars to establish a string of twenty-one missions, which served as the nuclei of permanent settlements, established a cattle ranching economy and converted thousands of Native Americans to Christianity.

Three diaries written by members of the expedition survive, giving unusually complete insight into the daily movements and experiences: One by Portolà himself, a record by Miguel Costansó, and a diary by Juan Crespí which is the most complete and detailed of the three.

When Portolà returned to New Spain in 1770, Pedro Fages (now promoted to captain) was appointed lieutenant governor of Alta California, with headquarters at the Presidio of Monterey. Fages led further exploratory trips to the east side of San Francisco Bay, and left his own diaries.

California Historical Landmarks #2, 21, 22, 23, 24, 25, 26, 27, 92, 94, 375, 394, 655, 665, 727, 784, 1058, and 1059 are all related to the Portolá Expedition.

== See also ==
- Timeline of the Portolá expedition
- The Californias
- Alta California
