= Domingo Elizondo =

Spanish explorer

Domingo Elizondo (c. 1710 – 1 June 1783, Madrid) was a Spanish colonel from Navarre who lived in the late 18th century.

== Information ==
Before coming to New Spain, Elizondo fought in the battlefields of Italy during the War of the Austrian Succession (1740–1748) and Seven Years' War (1756-1763). His main field of action was New Spain, where he served between 1767 and 1771.

In 1767, Elizondo was sent with 500 soldiers to Sonora. Between 1767 and 1771, he served throughout New Spain, fighting against the Seris and the Pimas in Mexico and Southern Arizona. He published a book about his experiences in the region.
