= Fernando Rivera y Moncada =

Mexican-born soldier of the Spanish Empire

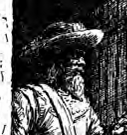

3rd Governor of the Californias
- In office 1774–1777
- Preceded by: Pedro Fages
- Succeeded by: Felipe de Neve

Personal details
- Born: c. 1725 near Compostela, Mexico
- Died: July 18, 1781 (aged 55–56) Lower Colorado River
- Profession: Soldier and military governor

Military service
- Allegiance: Spain

Fernando Javier Rivera y Moncada (c. 1725 – July 18, 1781) was a soldier of the Spanish Empire who served in The Californias (Las Californias), the far northwest frontier of New Spain. He participated in several early overland explorations and later served as third Governor of The Californias, from 1774 to 1777.

== History ==
=== Mexico ===
Rivera was born near Compostela, New Spain (now Mexico). His father, Don Cristóbal de Rivera, was locally prominent and a local office holder. Rivera was born of Don Cristóbal's second wife, Josefa Ramón de Moncada. Rivera had a total of 10 siblings and half-siblings; he was ninth in birth order. Rivera's pure Spanish blood but local birth made him a "criollo".

Rivera entered military service in 1742, serving in Loreto, Baja California, at a time when the colonial settlement of that peninsula comprised mostly Jesuit missions. In 1751 Rivera was elevated over several older and higher ranking soldiers to the command of the presidio (military headquarters). He participated in reconnaissance missions to previously unexplored northern areas of the peninsula, together with the Jesuit missionary-explorers Fernando Consag and Wenceslaus Linck.

In 1755, Rivera married Doña María Teresa Dávalos; a marriage probably arranged by their parents. The couple had four children; three boys and a girl. Rivera's tenure as military commander of Baja California was generally successful and he was highly thought of by the Jesuits, though he became embroiled in conflicts with local ranchers and miners whose aims were in conflict with those of the missions.

Rivera's situation changed in 1767 when the Jesuits were expelled and replaced in Baja California by Franciscans. The change in mission leadership was concurrent with installation of civil authority by New Spain. The story of the Jesuit expulsion is related to European power struggles of the time, but it had the effect of bringing to Baja California three individuals who shaped the subsequent history of the region: José de Gálvez, appointed "visitador" (roughly equivalent to inspector-general, a powerful office reporting directly to the Crown); Gaspar de Portolá, a Spanish soldier from a noble family, and Junípero Serra, newly appointed head of the Franciscan missions. Portolá, Serra, and Fernando de Rivera were thus together in remote Baja California at the moment when King Carlos III of Spain (advised by Gálvez), concerned about Russian and British encroachment on Spain's Pacific coast claims, ordered an expedition north to settle more northerly areas of The Californias. The newly explored northern regions became known as Upper (Alta) California, to distinguish those areas from older Lower (Baja) California. The Californias were officially split into "Alta" and "Baja" in 1804.

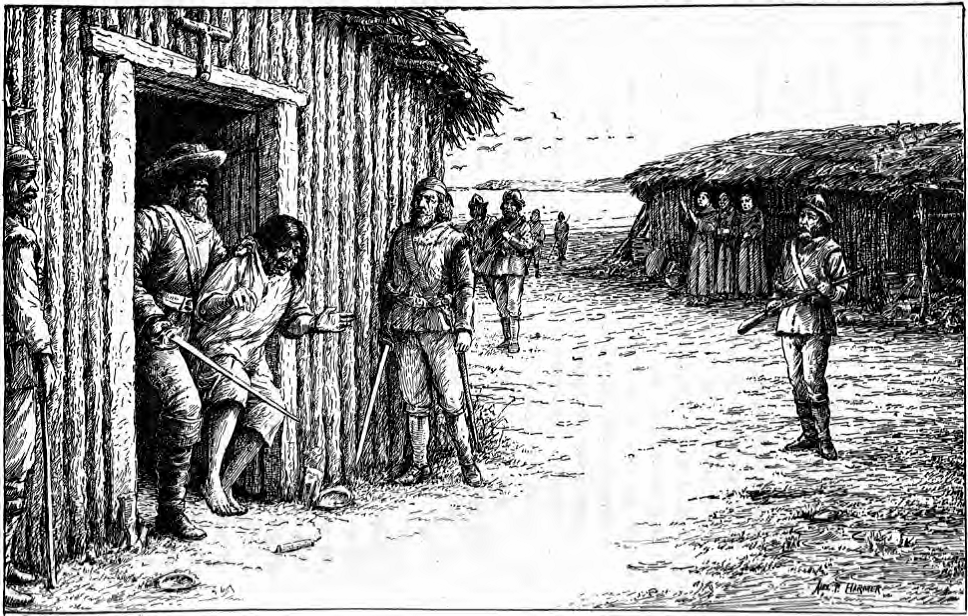
Captain Fernando Rivera y Moncada came into conflict with the Church when he violated ecclesiastical asylum at Mission San Diego de Alcalá. On March 26, 1776, he forcibly removed a neophyte in direct defiance of the priests. Missionary Pedro Font later described the scene: "Rivera entered the chapel with drawn sword ...(con la espada desnuda en la mano)." Rivera y Moncada was summarily excommunicated from the Roman Catholic Church for his actions.

=== Alta California ===
First overland expedition

Despite his conflict with the missionaries, Rivera was chosen to be second-in-command on the Portolá expedition, charged with provisioning the entire expedition. In 1769, traveling in advance of expedition leader Gaspar de Portolá, Rivera led the first overland party of the Portolá expedition, reaching San Diego, together with missionary diarist Juan Crespí and road-building-engineer José Cañizares. Portolá and missionary president Junípero Serra, arrived a few weeks later. Establishment of a colony at San Diego achieved the first of the expedition's two primary objectives.

After the several land and sea groups reassembled at San Diego (where there was much suffering and death among the sea-borne legs, from scurvy), Rivera continued north with Portolá in the search for Monterey Bay, second objective of the expedition. By failing to recognize Monterey when they first saw it, the expedition continued to the north and discovered San Francisco Bay before returning to San Diego. A second foray, a few months later, recognized the error and established a colony at Monterey. After journeying south to resupply San Diego, Rivera retired to the Mexican mainland around 1772, but he was soon recalled to service.

==== Military Governor of The Californias ====
Serra and the Franciscans had quarreled with California's second lieutenant (military) governor, Pedro Fages (who replaced Portolá), and Rivera took over as Fages' replacement in 1774. Rivera himself was soon in conflict with Serra and the Franciscans, and also with Juan Bautista de Anza, commander of two new overland expeditions to "Alta" California in 1774–75. The conflict with Serra came because Serra wanted to found as many new missions as possible, while Rivera, with only about 60 soldiers to police a strip of land 450 miles long, wanted to wait for reinforcements. The conflict with Anza arose out of insults (unintentionally) given by Rivera, combined with the strong ego of Anza.

Although preferring a site further south (in the area of modern Palo Alto), Rivera ultimately acceded to Serra's wish to locate a mission and presidio at the northern end of the peninsula that is home to modern San Francisco. Missions at Santa Clara and San Juan Capistrano were also founded under Rivera's governorship. (The first civilian town in Alta California, the Pueblo de San José de Guadalupe (modern San Jose, California), was founded a few weeks after Rivera departed.)

Prior to the arrival of the 1774 Anza expedition, Rivera led scouting expeditions from Monterey to the target areas. Accompanied by missionary Francisco Palóu, this party became the first Europeans to visit the shores of the entrance to San Francisco Bay, later dubbed the "Golden Gate". The earlier Portolá expedition found San Francisco Bay but, view blocked by the intervening hills, failed to discover its narrow entrance channel. The 1772 Fages expedition saw the Golden Gate, but from the opposite side of the bay, in the vicinity of modern Oakland. Also on the 1774 trip, Palóu named a long valley formed (unknown to the explorers) by coastal California's largest earthquake fault, just south of modern San Francisco. Palou's name, Cañada de San Andrés later became "San Andreas", and was applied to the fault line itself.

When several Kumeyaay Indian communities joined to sack the mission at San Diego in 1775, governor Rivera had the responsibility of suppressing the revolt. As punishment for the forcible removal of one of the rebels from a temporary church building at the mission, Rivera was excommunicated by leaders of the Alta California Franciscans, including Junípero Serra, Pedro Font (who had quarreled with Rivera) and Fermín Lasuén. Lasuén had been Rivera's only close personal friend during his period in Alta California. Rivera was a religiously observant man and the excommunication clearly troubled him greatly. The excommunication was subsequently overturned when he returned the Indian to the church, then turned around and formally requested that the Indian be handed over to him (which did in fact occur). Even during the events, there was disagreement among the Franciscans over whether excommunication had in fact been warranted.

==== Post-California duties ====
Following his tenure as governor, in 1777 Rivera was reassigned as military commander (and vice-governor of The Californias) at Loreto. His final assignment was to recruit settlers for the new pueblo (secular settlement) of Los Ángeles, and transport them to Alta California via the overland route from northern Mexico. Although the settlers made it safely to southern California, Rivera and many of his soldiers were killed along with the local missionaries including Francisco Garcés, near the Mission-Pueblo settlement of Puerto de Purísima Concepción on the lower Colorado River during the revolt of the Quechan Indians in July 1781. The Quechan/Yuma Revolt of 1781 was a critical event, because the Native victory shut down overland transportation between Northern Mexico and Alta California for the next 50 years, ensuring that Spain, and later Mexico, would never be able to populate Alta California sufficiently to stave off the swarm of immigrants from eastern North America who would ultimately seize Alta California in the Mexican–American War of 1846–48.

Rivera's family had to wait 19 years after his death before the Spanish government finally paid out to them the substantial sums that Rivera was owed for back pay. The delay was mostly due to the fact that most records of what Rivera had been advanced, as well as the actual sums that he had been advanced, had been either destroyed or captured by the Yuma Indians in the 1781 uprising. By the time the payments were finally made, Rivera's widow and three of his four children were already dead (though there were also grandchildren, who had suffered in poverty during the interim).

== Rivera's reputation ==
Rivera has often been viewed somewhat negatively in historical literature. He is accused of having been uncooperative with Father Serra, too timid about founding new missions, and insufficiently supportive of founding a settlement at San Francisco. Against these positions it is worth pointing out that Rivera had only a handful—never more than 100—soldiers to police 450 miles of California, in which lived tens of thousands of natives who were potentially hostile and certainly in shock as their lives were forcibly changed; and also that three missions were established under Rivera, while only a single mission would be founded in the ten years after he departed. No one has ever alleged that Rivera was in any way self-serving; it is possible that he was in just slightly over his head in trying to manage the settlement of Alta California - a difficult assignment. But despite his many accomplishments—leading (and later commanding) several important early explorations, escorting to California a large share of the early settlers, almost all of the civilian livestock, and sustaining the settlements at San Diego and Monterey—Rivera is little-remembered today except by historians of California. It seems an oversight.
