= Juan Crespí =

Franciscan missionary and explorer (1721–1782)

The Reverend Juan Crespí OFM
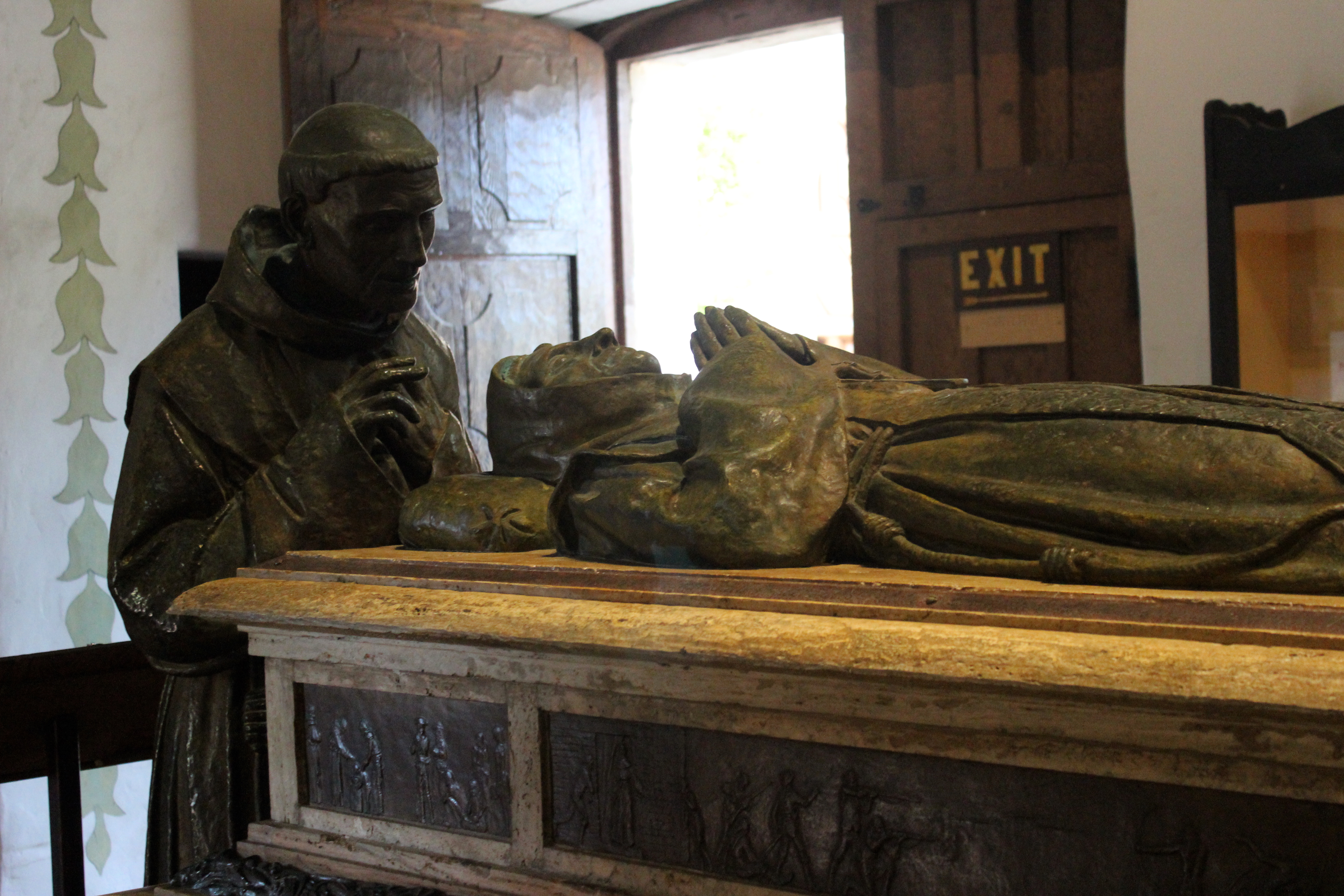
- Cenotaph of Saint Junípero Serra in the Mission San Carlos Borromeo, Carmel-by-the-Sea (1924); Fr. Juan Crespí, who predeceased Serra, stands at the head, praying over him.
- Born: 1 March 1721; Palma de Mallorca, Spain
- Died: 1 January 1782 (aged 60); Carmel-by-the-Sea, Las Californias, New Spain
- Resting place: Mission San Carlos Borromeo de Carmelo
- Occupations: Roman Catholic priest, missionary, explorer

Juan Crespí, OFM (Catalan: Joan Crespí; 1 March 1721 – 1 January 1782) was a Franciscan missionary and explorer of Las Californias.

== Biography ==
A native of Mallorca, Crespí entered the Franciscan order at age 17. He came to New Spain in 1749, and accompanied explorers Francisco Palóu and Junípero Serra. In 1767, Crespí went to the Baja California Peninsula and was placed in charge of the Misión La Purísima Concepción de Cadegomó.

In 1769, Crespí joined the expedition led by Gaspar de Portolá and Junípero Serra (see Timeline of the Portolá expedition). He travelled in the vanguard of the land expedition to San Diego, led by Captain Fernando Rivera y Moncada, where a presidio and mission were established. Crespí then continued north with Portolá and Rivera to identify the port of Monterey. Because he was the only one of the Franciscans to make the entire journey by land, Crespí became the first official diarist for the missions. He was one of three diarists to document the first exploration by Europeans of the interior areas of Alta California.

Crespí is credited with giving Los Angeles its name, after having named the region's primary river El Río de Nuestra Señora la Reina de los Ángeles de Porciúncula, meaning, in Spanish, "the River of Our Lady Queen of the Angels of Porciuncula". The town that later formed nearby took its name from this river.

After reaching Monterey in October 1769, Crespí continued with the expedition that explored as far north as present-day San Francisco, and became one of the first Europeans to see San Francisco Bay. All told, the expedition traveled in the future state of California through the present-day coastal counties of San Diego, Orange, Los Angeles, Ventura, Santa Barbara, San Luis Obispo, Monterey, Santa Cruz, San Mateo, and San Francisco.

In 1772, Crespí accompanied Captain Pedro Fages on an exploration of areas to the east of San Francisco Bay. The Fages expedition members were the first Europeans to see the Sacramento River and the San Joaquin Valley.

In 1774, Crespí was chaplain of the expedition to the North Pacific conducted by Juan José Pérez Hernández. His diaries, first published in H. E. Bolton's Fray Juan Crespi (1927, repr. 1971), and published in the original Spanish with facing page translations as A Description of Distant Roads: Original Journals of the First Expedition into California, 1769-1770 (2001) provided valuable records of these expeditions. One chapel he built, at the Misión San Francisco del Valle de Tilaco in Landa, is reported as still standing.

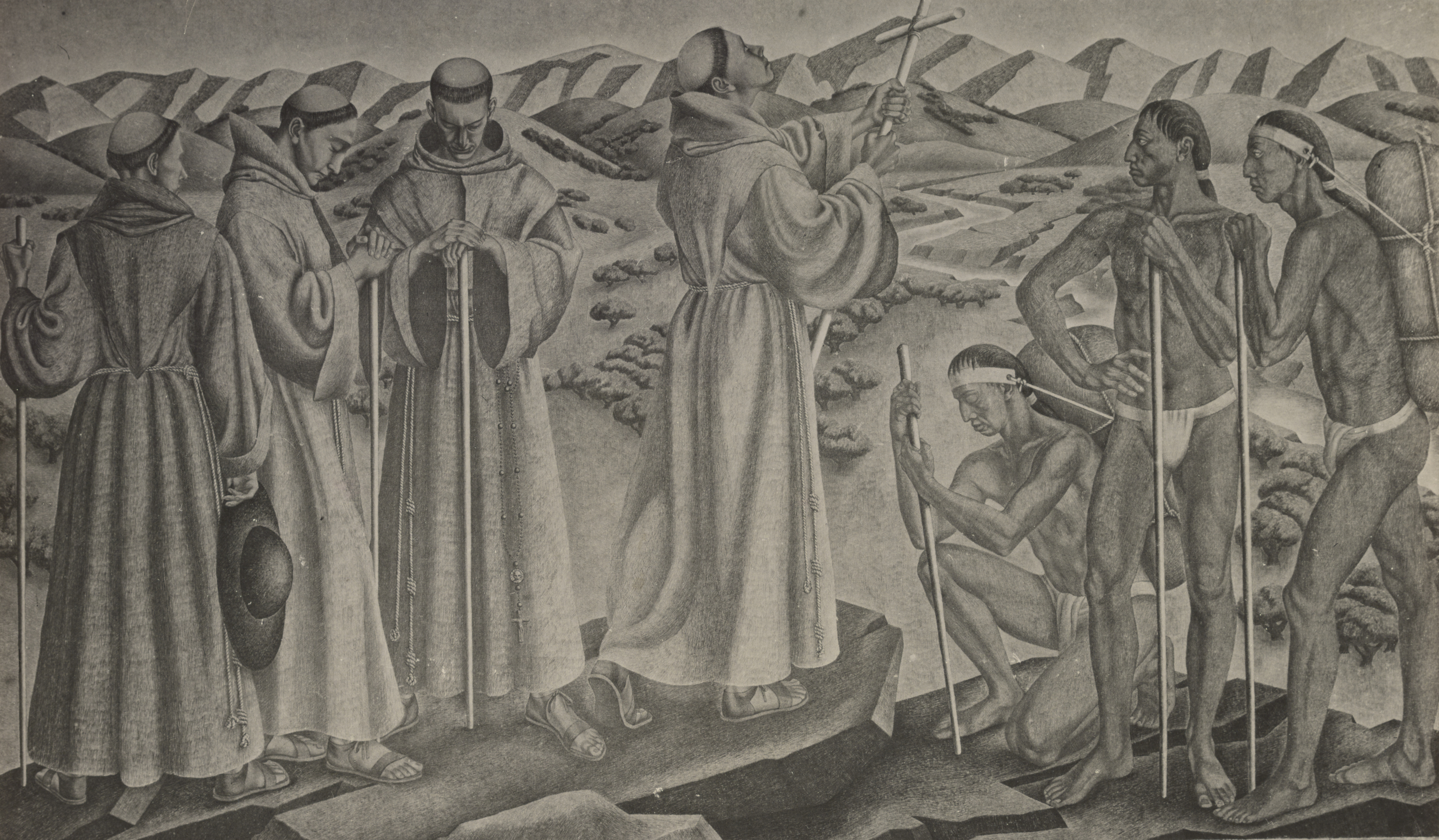
The Trek of Father Crespi, 1777, by Katherine S. Works, 1938

== Recognition ==
A Catholic boys' school, Crespi Carmelite High School in Encino, is named for him, as was a middle school in the West Contra Costa Unified School District. The latter was renamed Betty Reid Soskin Middle School on her 100th birthday on 22 September 2021.
