= Encomenderos de Negros =

Encomenderos de negros, a term unique to New Spain, were specialized middlemen in the African slave trade in colonial Mexico during the first half of the seventeenth century.

In the colonial-era historiography, the term encomendero generally refers to men granted the labor and tribute of a particular indigenous group in the immediate post-conquest era, sometimes termed encomenderos de indios. In contrast, encomenderos de negros, were Portuguese slave dealers who were permitted to operate in Mexico for the slave trade. The early Atlantic slave trade was in the hands of the Portuguese, whose empire controlled the West African coast. African slaves shipped to Spanish America in the period up to 1640 were transported on Portuguese vessels and the merchants selling them were also Portuguese.

Ships docked in the Gulf Coast port of Veracruz Nueva, and encomenderos de negros transported slaves inland to New Spain's second largest city, Puebla de los Angeles. Since slaves were considered just another type of commercial good, and the buying and selling of slaves were recorded in bills of slave, there is considerable documentation on these middlemen and their slave captives found in colonial-era Mexican archives. Encomenderos de negros facilitated the transport and well-being of slaves, as well as cash advances for their human chattel into the highland plateau. They sometimes were found to be committing tax evasion, since the crown was owed the sales tax (alcabala) on each slave sold. Encomenderos de Negros were permanent residents (vecinos) of Puebla, Mexico's second largest city and a node of the African slave trade in which Portuguese dominated up until Portuguese independence in 1640.

Being deemed residents conferred privileges and obligations on those so classified. While factors inspected ships and drew up the inventory of slaves for the record, encomenderos de negros were engaged in logistics of transport and slave sales once on land. The number of slaves imported increased in the 1620s, as demand increased. Encomenderos de negros were part of a well-financed network that included muleteers (arrieros) and innkeepers. The system broke down when Portugal achieved its independence from Spain in 1640. After that date, inexperienced middle men were unable to successfully replace the Portuguese middlemen.
