= Francisco Bahamonde de Lugo =

Spanish explorer and 25th governor of Puerto Rico

25th Governor of Puerto Rico
- In office 21 August 1564 – 6 October 1569
- Monarch: Philip II
- Viceroy of New Spain: Francisco Ceinos (as interim, Dean of the Audiencia); Gastón Carrillo de Peralta; Alonso Muñoz & Luis Carrillo (as acting, Royal commissioners of New Spain); Francisco Ceinos (as acting, Dean of the Audiencia); Martín Enríquez de Almanza
- Preceded by: Antonio de la Llama Vallejo
- Succeeded by: Francisco de Solís Osorio

Personal details
- Born: La Orotava, Tenerife, Canary Islands, Spain
- Died: 1574 Cartagena de Indias, Colombia
- Relations: Francisco de Lugo, el Bueno (father), Leonor Benítez Pereyra de Lugo (mother)
- Profession: city founder, Conquistador, Military

Francisco Bahamonde de Lugo was Governor of Puerto Rico (1564–1568) and Governor of Cartagena de Indias (1572–1574). He died in office in Cartagena.

== Governor of Puerto Rico ==
The population of San Germán, located then in Guayanilla, asked him for permission to move the villa to its present location due to the attacks of French privateers (1565) and Caribbean Indians (1568). In 1567, Bahamonde complained to the king of Spain about illegal immigration to Puerto Rico and the king advised him on what he could do.

In 1568, the governor Francisco Bahamonde de Lugo saw the necessity to ask for the services of a Spanish doctor. The doctor chosen was Hernando de Cataño, who when accepting the position, received like payments in a lot and several parcels of land (in Spanish, "caballería", an archaic measure of area equivalent to 100 by 200 feet, or 1,858 m^{2}) located across the harbor from the islet of San Juan. Thus the place was named after its owner.

== Family ==
Francisco Bahamonde de Lugo was born in the Canary Islands into the noble family that conquered the islands for the Crown of Castile. He was a descendant of Inés de Lugo, sister of Alonso Fernández de Lugo, first Adelantado of the Canary Islands.
