= Miguel López de Legazpi =

Spanish conquistador, navigator, and colonial administrator (1502–1572)

Adelantado Miguel López de Legazpi
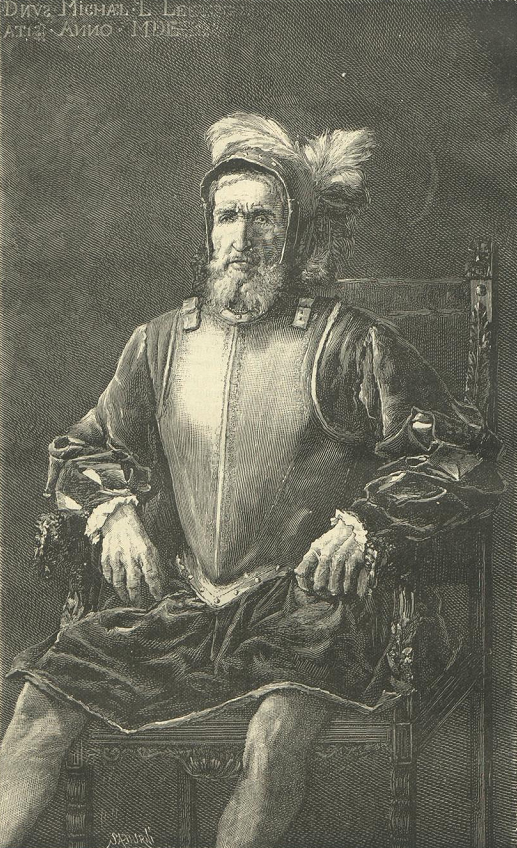

Governor-General of the Captaincy General of the Philippines
- In office 27 April 1565 – 20 August 1572
- Monarch: Philip II
- Governor: (Viceroy of New Spain); Francisco Ceinos; Gastón de Peralta, 3rd Marquess of Falces; Alonso Muñoz and Luis Carrillo; Martín Enríquez de Almanza
- Preceded by: Inaugural holder
- Succeeded by: Guido de Lavezaris

Personal details
- Born: Miguel López de Legazpi; 12 June 1502 Zumarraga, Gipuzkoa, Crown of Castile
- Died: 20 August 1572 (aged 70) Intramuros, Manila, Captaincy General of the Philippines
- Resting place: San Agustin Church, Manila

Don Miguel López de Legazpi (Note: Spanish pronunciation: [miˈɣel ˈlopeθ ðe leˈɣaθpi]) (12 June 1502 – 20 August 1572), also known as El Adelantado and El Viejo (The Elder), was a Spanish conquistador who financed and led an expedition to conquer the Philippine islands in the mid-16th century. He was joined by Guido de Lavezares, relative Martin de Goiti, friar Andrés de Urdaneta, and his grandsons Juan and Felipe de Salcedo, in the expedition. Legazpi established the first Spanish settlement in the East Indies after his expedition crossed the Pacific Ocean, arriving in Cebu in 1565.

He became the first governor-general of the Spanish East Indies, which was administered from New Spain for the Spanish crown. It also encompassed other Pacific islands, namely Guam, the Mariana Islands, Palau, and the Carolinas. After obtaining peace with various indigenous tribes and kingdoms, he made Cebu City the capital of the Spanish East Indies in 1565 and later transferred to Manila in 1571. The capital city of the province of Albay bears his name. Coincidentally, his birthday of 12 June was later the day of the Philippine Declaration of Independence from Spain in 1898 during the term of Diego de los Rios, the last Spanish governor-general of the Philippines.

== Early years ==
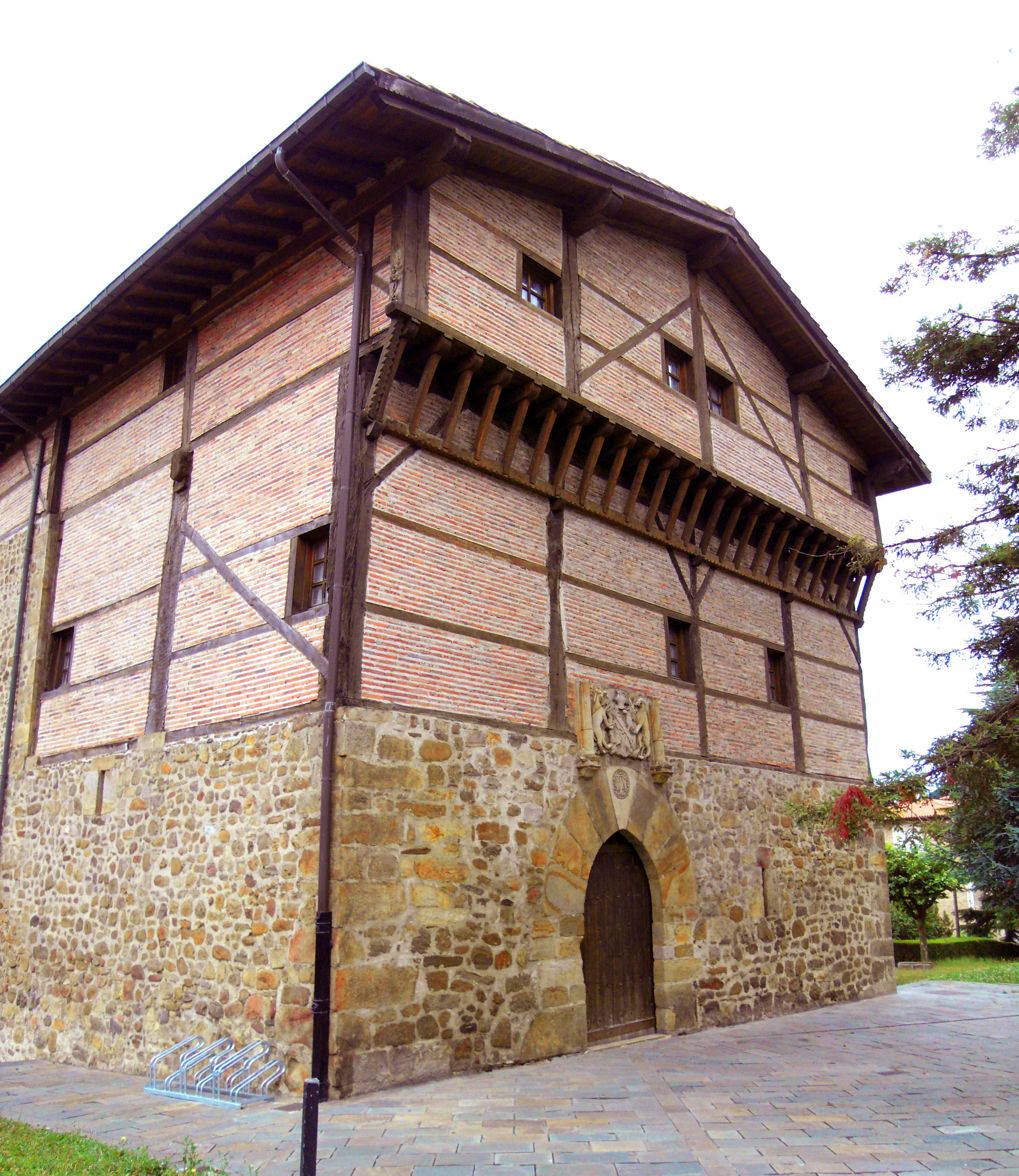
Birthplace of López de Legazpi in Zumarraga, Basque Country

Miguel López de Legazpi was born on 12 June 1502 in the town of Zumarraga in the Basque province of Guipúzcoa, Spain. His family was wealthy and held important positions in the military and in municipal administration. His father, Juan de Legazpi, was a soldier who fought under Gonzalo Fernández de Córdoba in the Italian Wars. Later, he led troops against a French army in the Spanish province of Guipúzcoa. His mother, Elvira de Gurruchátegui, also belonged to a distinguished provincial family.

The details of his education are unknown, but based on his later work and administrative positions it seems likely that he received training in law. While his father was still alive, López de Legazpi worked as a councilor in the municipal government of his town. After his father's death in 1527, his older brother inherited the family wealth and leadership positions.

== New Spain ==
Around 1528 Legazpi settled in New Spain, the Spanish colony recently created from the conquests of Hernán Cortés in Mexico. He likely left home to seek new opportunities but the exact circumstances of his move are unclear. He may have been part of the retinue of Juan de Zumárraga, a fellow Basque who was appointed by Charles V to become the first bishop and inquisitor in New Spain.

After his arrival, Legazpi served in a number of positions both civil and ecclesiastical. For a while he was clerk of the mint. He was then secretary of the municipal council and became alcalde mayor of Mexico City in 1559. He also served in the Court of Inquisition and was involved in several inquisitorial processes between 1536 and 1543. In recognition of his service, he was awarded several land grants and privately acquired additional property in the capital and in the territory of Michoacán.

In 1532 he married Isabel Garcés, the sister of Julián Garcés, first bishop of Tlaxcala. The couple had nine children, four boys and five girls. At some time before 1559 his wife died. His oldest daughter, Teresa, had two children, Felipe and Juan, who participated with their grandfather in the conquest of the Philippines.

== Expedition to the Philippines ==
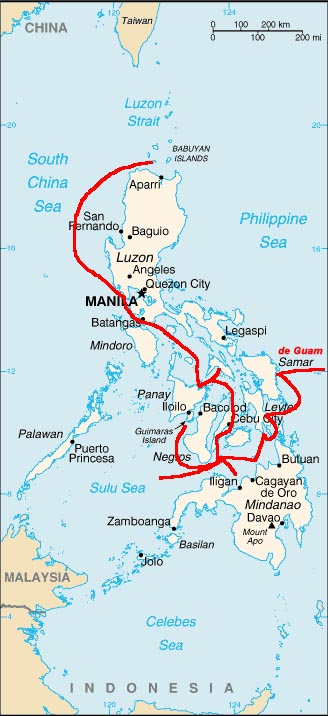
A route of the Spanish expeditions in the Philippines.

In 1564, López de Legazpi was commissioned by the viceroy, Luís de Velasco, to lead an expedition in the Pacific Ocean, to find the Spice Islands where the earlier explorers Ferdinand Magellan and Ruy López de Villalobos had landed in 1521 and 1543, respectively. The expedition was ordered by King Philip II of Spain. The viceroy died in July 1564, but the Audiencia and López de Legazpi completed the preparations for the expedition.

On 19 or 20 November 1564, five ships, carrying 500 soldiers, over half of whom were Mexicans (Criollos, Mestizos and Indios) and the remaining, Spaniards, sailed from the port of Barra de Navidad, New Spain, in what is now Jalisco state, Mexico (other sources give the date as 1 November 1564, and mention 'four ships and 379 men') the flagship nao San Pabló, the almiranta San Pedro, and the pinnaces San Juan and San Lucas. Members of the expedition included six Augustinian missionaries, in addition to Fr. Andrés de Urdaneta, who served as navigator and spiritual adviser, Melchor de Legazpi (Miguel López de Legazpi's son), Felipe de Salcedo (one of Miguel López de Legazpi's grandsons), and Guido de Lavezaris (a survivor of Ruy López de Villalobos's expedition).

López de Legazpi and his men sailed the Pacific Ocean for 93 days. In 1565, they landed in the Mariana Islands, where they briefly anchored and replenished their supplies. There they fought with Chamorro tribes and burned several huts.

=== Arrival in the Philippines ===
A chief of Bohol island named Sikatuna gave information to Miguel López about Cebu and accompanied López as a guide. López de Legazpi's expedition anchored off the Indianized Rajahnate of Cebu on 13 February 1565, but did not put ashore due to opposition from natives.

On 22 February 1565, the expedition reached the island of Samar and made a blood compact with its chief, Datu Urrao. The Spaniards then proceeded to Limasawa and were received by Datu Bankaw, then to Bohol, where they befriended Datu Sikatuna (or Catunao) and Rajah Sigala. On 16 March 1565, López de Legazpi made a blood compact with Datu Sikatuna. (Note: Datu, Lakan, and Rajah were administrative titles used at the time by local hereditary rulers.)

On 27 April 1565, the expedition returned to Cebu and landed there. Rajah Tupas challenged the Spaniards, but was overpowered. The Spaniards established a colony, naming the settlements "Villa del Santisimo Nombre de Jesús" (Town of the Most Holy Name of Jesus) after an image of Sto. Niño in one of the native houses.

In 1568, the Portuguese attempted a blockade of Cebu to expel the Spaniards. The Spanish colony proved to be resistant to the blockade and the Portuguese fleet withdrew as it suffered from an outbreak of typhoid fever.

=== Panay and Mindoro ===
In 1569, due to a scarcity of food provisions in Cebu, López de Legazpi transferred to Panay town on the island of Panay. Subsequently, they founded a second settlement, then named Capiz and now the city of Roxas in Capiz province, located on the bank of the Panay River. In 1570, López de Legazpi sent Juan de Salcedo, his grandson who had arrived from Mexico in 1567, to Mindoro to fight the Muslim Moro. Salcedo also destroyed forts on the islands of Ilin and Lubang, respectively South and Northwest of Mindoro

=== Luzon and the capture of Manila ===
In 1570, having heard of the rich resources in Luzon, López de Legazpi dispatched Martín de Goiti to explore the northern region. Landing in Batangas with a force of 120 Spaniards, de Goiti explored the Pansipit River, which drains Taal Lake. On 8 May, they arrived in modern Manila Bay. There, they were welcomed by the natives. Goiti's soldiers camped there for a few weeks while forming an alliance with the Muslim leader, Rajah Ache (better known as Rajah Matanda), who was a vassal under the Sultan of Brunei. López de Legazpi wanted to use Maynila's harbor as a base for trade with China. However, the Rajah's ally in northern shores of the bay, historically known as the young Bambalito of Macabebe, asked Rajah Soliman (Old Ache) to revoke his alliance with the Spaniards. Rajah Matanda refused because of the "word of honor" of the Spaniards. Rajah Soliman had his conditions for Bambalito that if they were able to kill as least 50 Spaniards, he would revoke his alliance with López de Legazpi, and the Old Ache would help to expel the conquerors. Bambalito rode back to Macabebe and formed a fleet of two thousand five hundred moros consisting of soldiers from the villages along Maynila Bay particularly from Macabebe and Hagonoy. On 30 May 1570, Bambalito sailed to Tondo with Caracoas and encountered the Spaniards at Bangkusay Channel, headed by Martin de Goiti on 3 June 1571. Bambalito and his fleet lost the battle and the Spaniards occupied the Islamized states of Tondo and Maynila. Maynila was prepared by Goiti for López de Legazpi who left Panay.

In the same year, more reinforcements arrived in the Philippines, prompting López de Legazpi to leave Cebu for Panay and then for Luzon. He recruited 250 Spanish soldiers and 600 native warriors to explore the regions of Leyte and Panay. The following year, he followed Goiti and Salcedo in Maynila, after learning that the villages had been conquered.

During the early phase of the exploration of the northern part of the Philippines, López de Legazpi remained in Cebu and did not accompany his men during their conquest of Maynila because of health problems and advanced age. In Maynila, López de Legazpi formed a peace pact with the native councils as well as the local rulers, Rajah Sulayman and Lakan Dula). Both groups agreed to organize a city council, consisting of two mayors, twelve councilors and a secretary. López de Legazpi established a settlement there on 24 June 1571, and he also ordered the construction of the walled city of Intramuros. He proclaimed the town Manila to be the island's capital.

Upon the defeat of Bambalito, López de Legazpi ordered the exploration of the villages north of Manila. In September 1571, Goiti pacified Lubao and Betis, using riverine tributaries of Rio Chico, then he reached the settlements in Calumpit and Malolos on 14 November 1571 and other old villages mostly along Manila Bay. López de Legazpi had established a government on the islands and became the first Spanish governor-general of the Philippines.

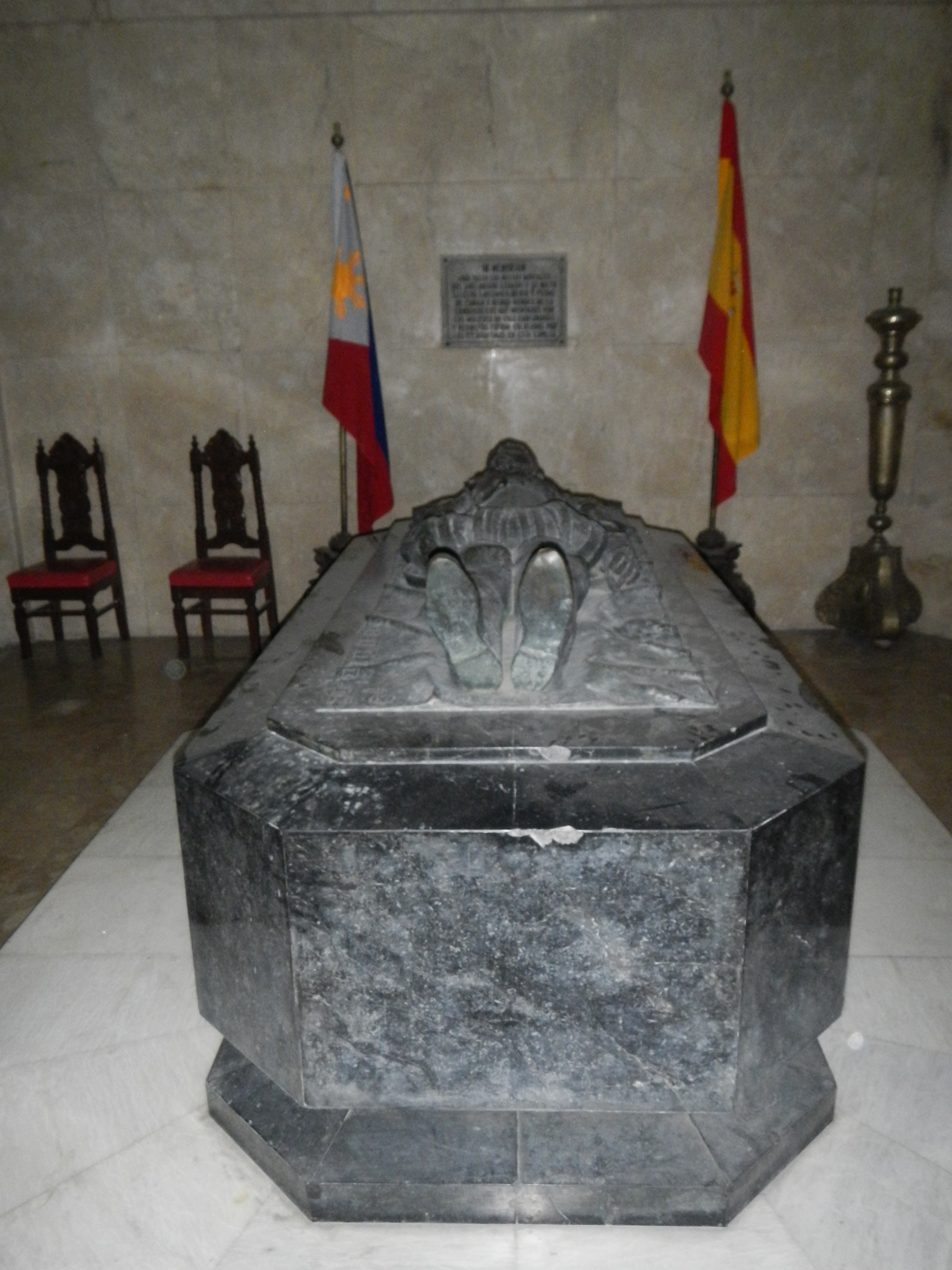
Tomb of Legazpi in San Agustin church inside the walled city of Manila

=== Last years ===
López de Legazpi governed the Philippines for a year before dying suddenly of a stroke in Manila on 20 August 1572 after scolding an aide. He died bankrupt, leaving a few pesos behind, due to having spent most of his personal fortune during the conquest. He was laid to rest in San Agustin Church, Intramuros.

By the time of López de Legazpi's death, the parts of the Visayas had passed to Spanish rule. The Spanish met strong resistance from Muslim sultanates on the island of Mindanao, the Zambal tribes of Zambales, and the Igorot of the Cordilleran mountains, as well as some Wokou pirates from China and Japan.

==== Letters to the King of Spain ====
During his final years, López de Legazpi wrote several letters to Philip II of Spain about his journey to the East Indies, and the conquest he had achieved. These were collectively known as the "Cartas al Rey Don Felipe II: sobre la expedición, conquistas y progresos de las islas Felipinas" (Letters to the King Lord Philip II: on the expedition, conquests, and progress of the Philippine Islands). The letters are preserved at the General Archive of the Indies in Seville, Spain.

=== Role of religion on the expedition ===
At the time of López de Legazpi's arrival, the natives of the archipelago practiced Islam, Hinduism, Buddhism and animism. Part of the motivation of the Spaniards was to evangelize the population and convert people to Roman Catholicism.

With the Augustinian, Franciscan and other friars, who had helped him establish a government on the islands, López de Legazpi worked to convert the natives to the Christian religion. In 1609, Antonio de Morga, Alcalde of Criminal Causes, in the Royal Audiencia of New Spain wrote:

After the islands had been conquered by the sovereign light of the holy gospel which entered therein, the heathen were baptized, the darkness of their paganism was banished and they changed their own for Christian names. The islands also, losing their former name, took — with the change of religion and the baptism of their inhabitants — that of Filipinas Islands, in recognition of the great favors received at the hands of his Majesty Filipe the Second, our sovereign, in whose fortunate time and reign they were conquered, protected and encouraged, as a work and achievement of his royal hands.

== Legacy ==
The López de Legazpi and Urdaneta expedition to the Philippines effectively created the trans-Pacific Manila galleon trade, in which silver mined from Mexico and Potosí was exchanged for Chinese silk, porcelain, Indonesian spices, Indian gems and other goods precious to Europe at the time. The trade route formed an important commercial link between Latin America and the Asia-Pacific with the trade products even carried over to Europe via the Havana Galleons, while heavily financing the Spanish Empire. The introduction of Western ingredients, goods, and imperialism brought about the 'Hispanization' of the islands.

For the next 333 years, from 1565 when Spain first established a presence in the country and ruled it from Mexico City and Madrid, until the Treaty of Paris on 10 December 1898, the Philippines was a Spanish possession (including the years 1762–1764 when the British controlled Manila and the port city of Cavite but not the whole country).

== Media portrayals ==
- Portrayed by Mark Gil in the 2013 TV series, Indio.
- Appears in Civilization VII as a Conquistador for the Spanish Empire in the exploration era.

== Gallery ==
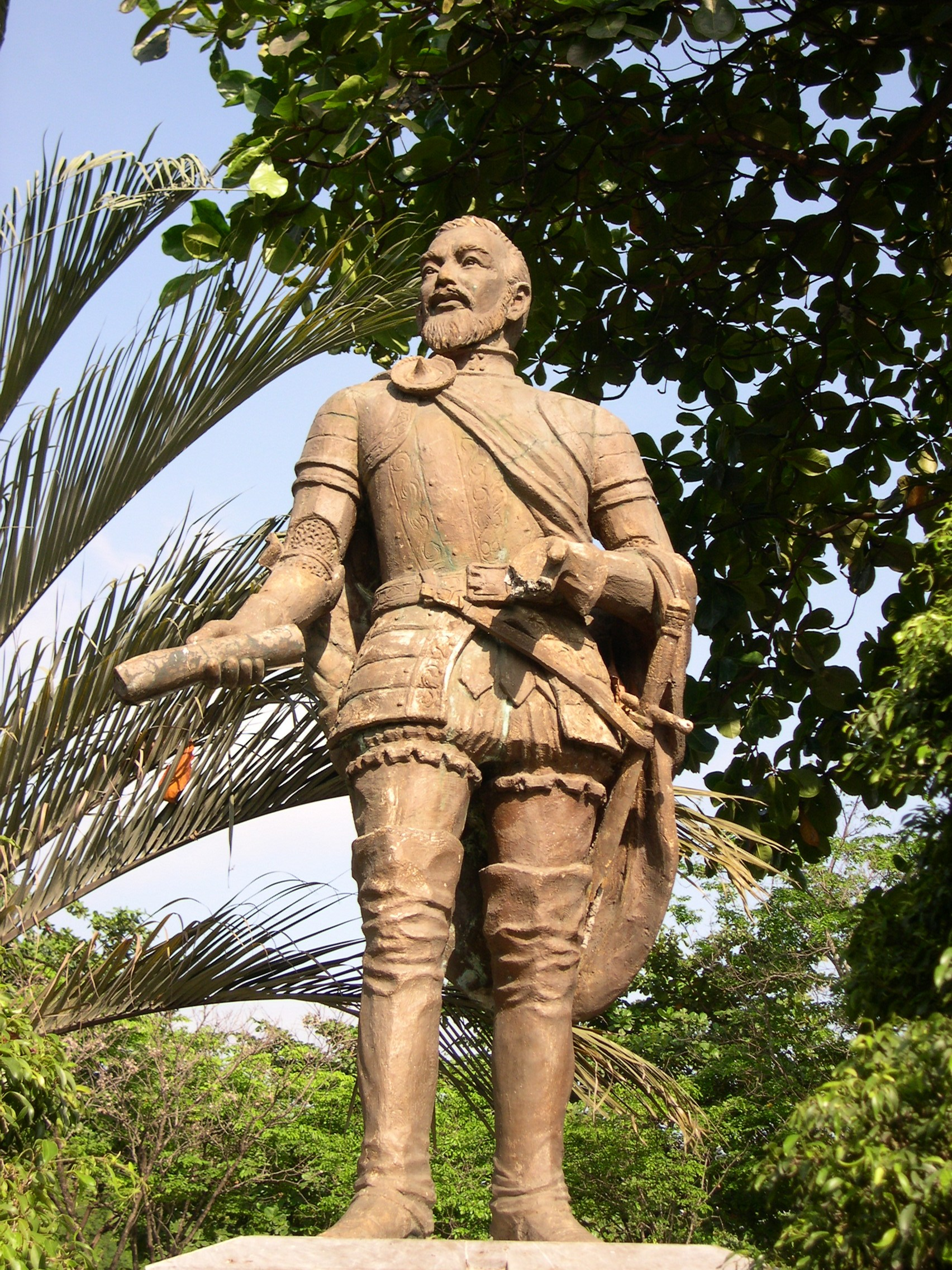
Statue of López de Legazpi outside of Fort San Pedro, Cebu City

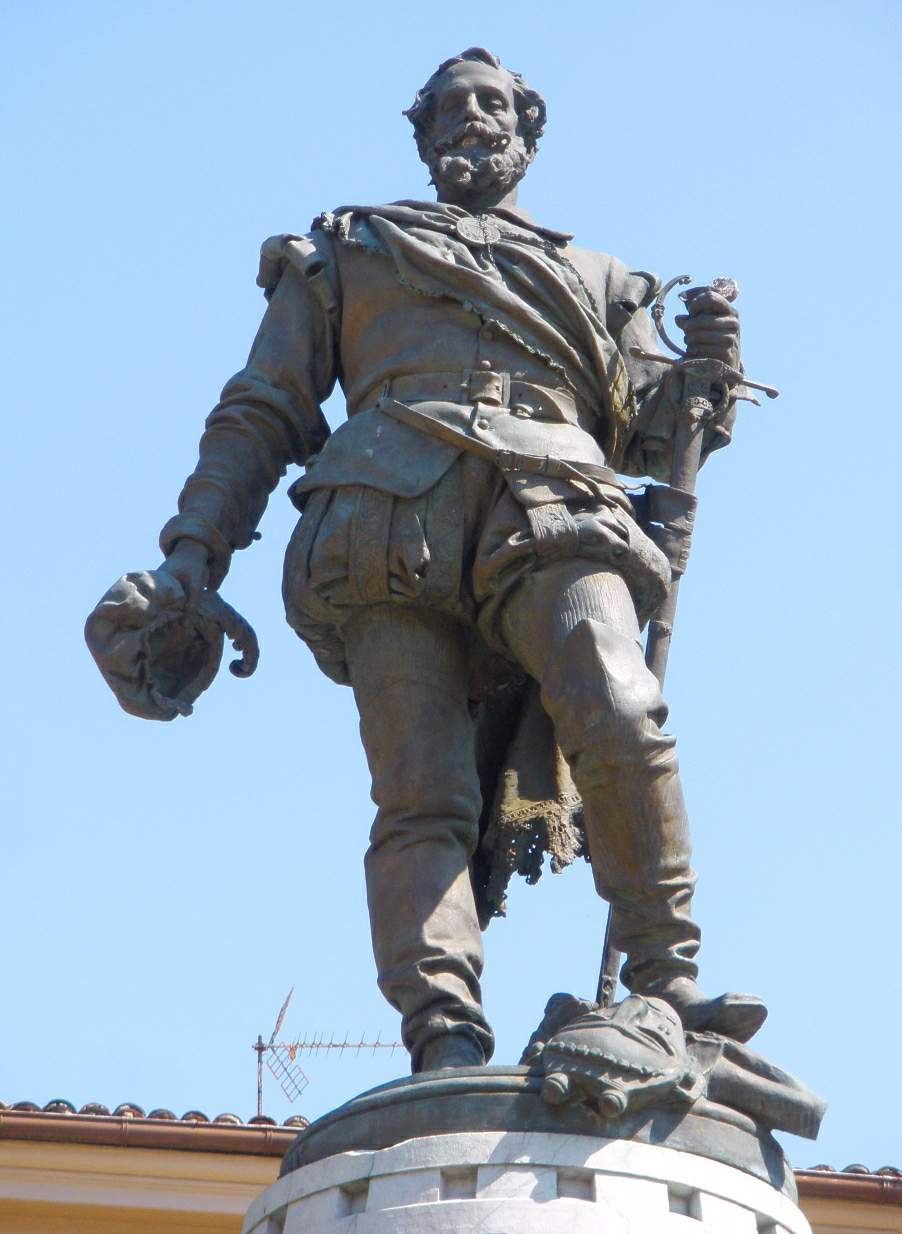
Statue of López de Legazpi in Zumarraga, Spain

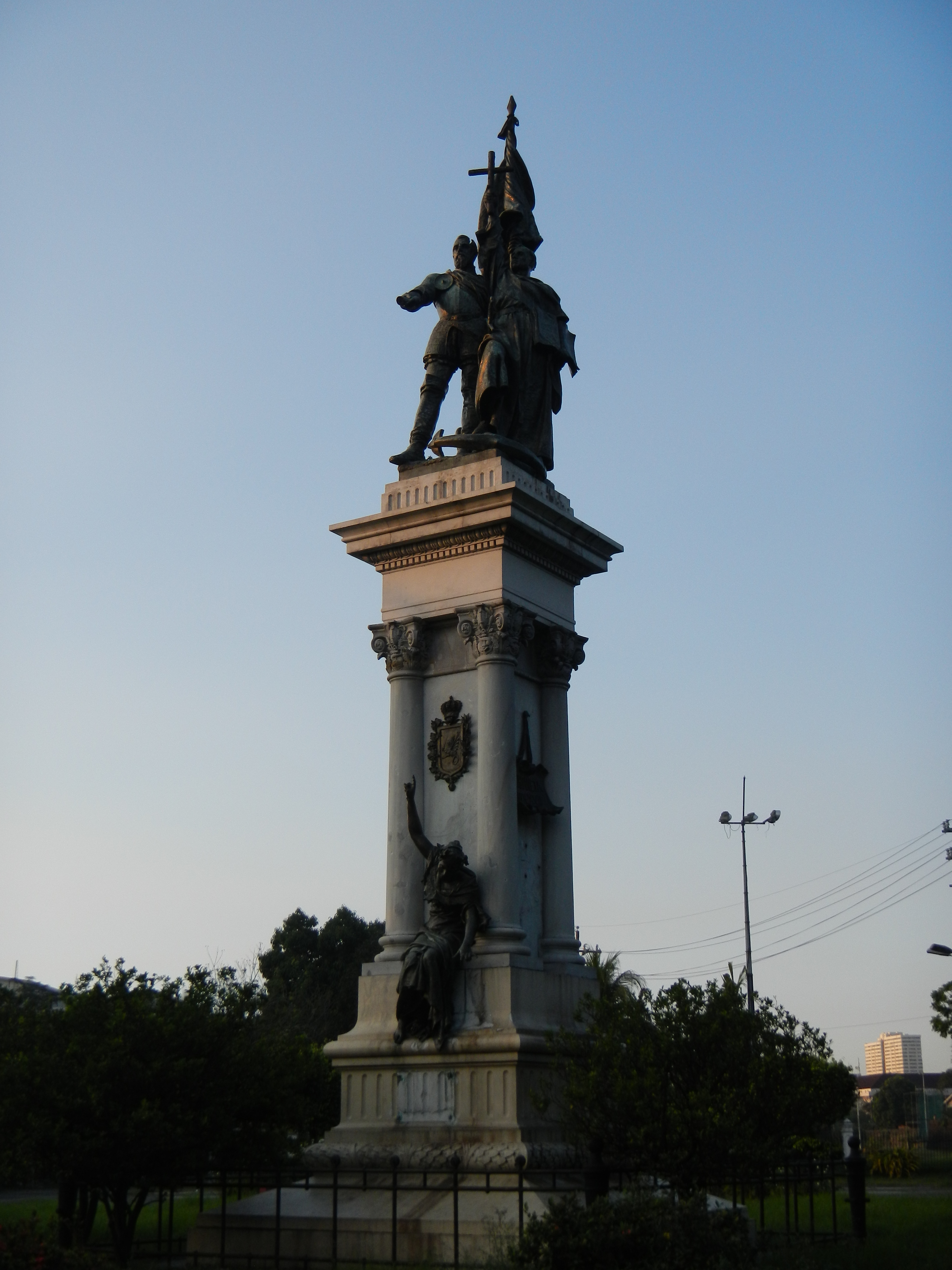
López de Legazpi-Urdaneta Monument in Manila

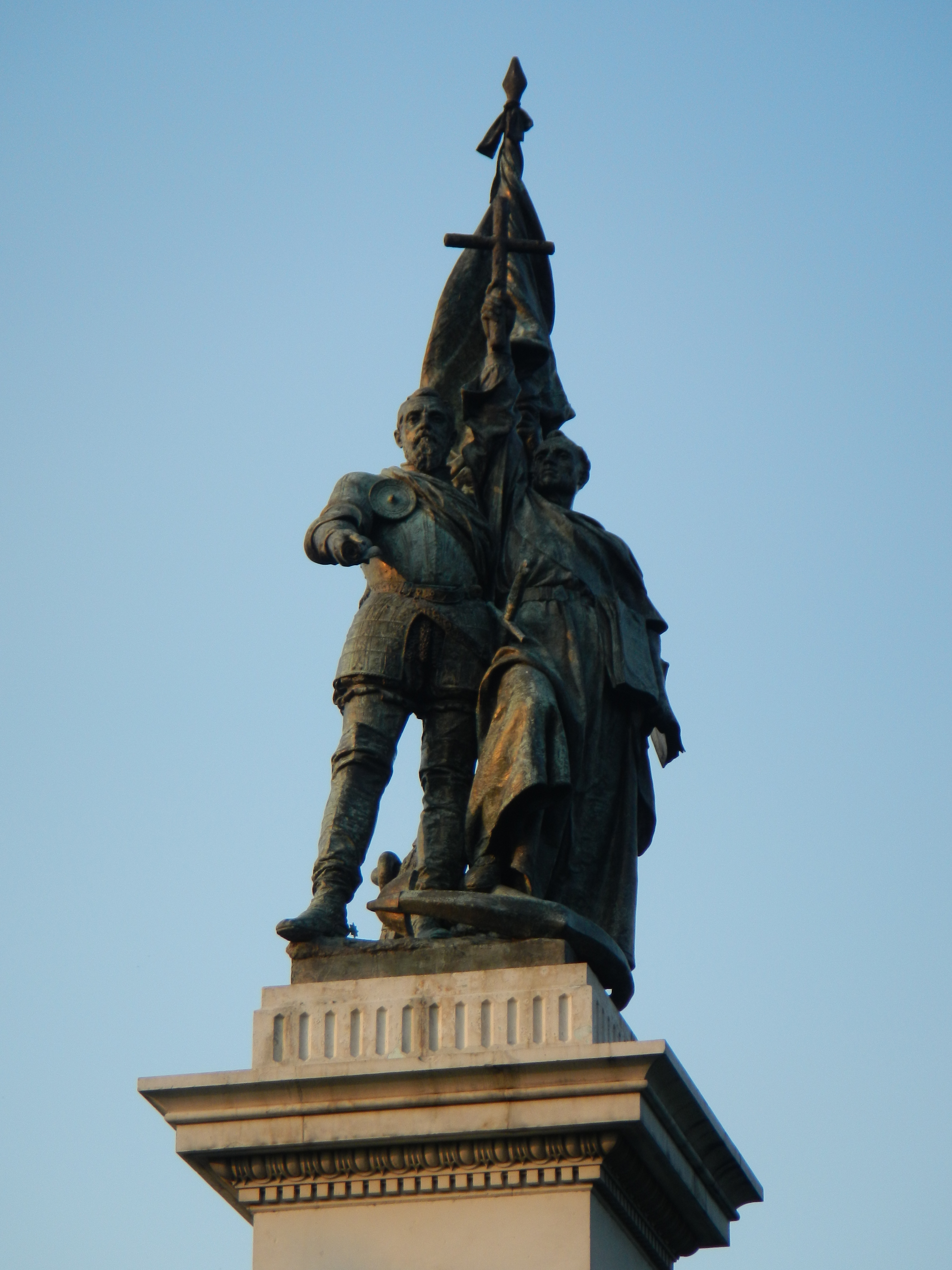
Miguel López de Legazpi and Andrés de Urdaneta, Manila

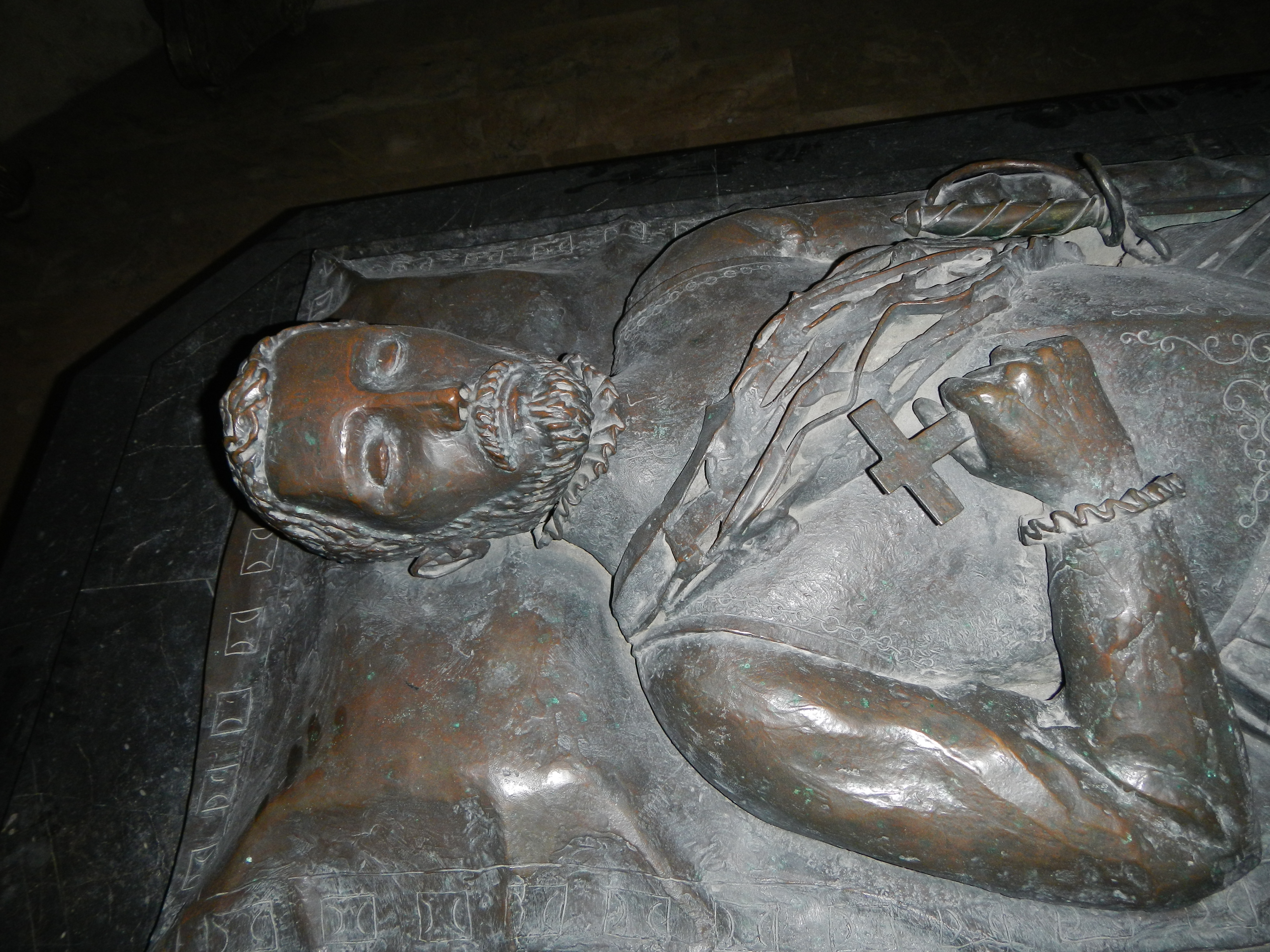
The mortal remains of López de Legazpi are interred in the San Agustin Church, Manila.

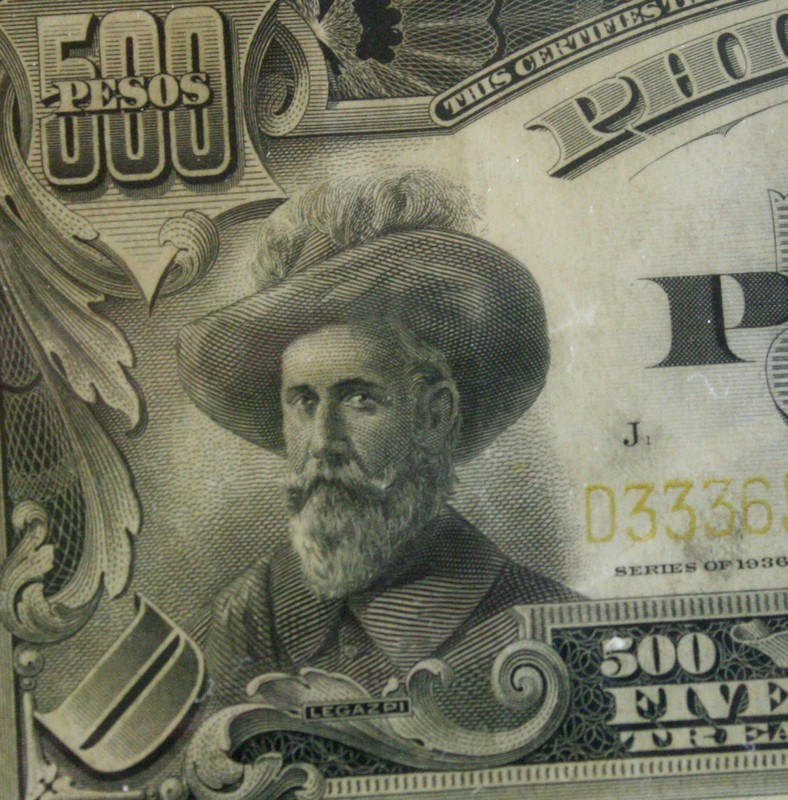
López de Legazpi on a 500 peso banknote, 1936

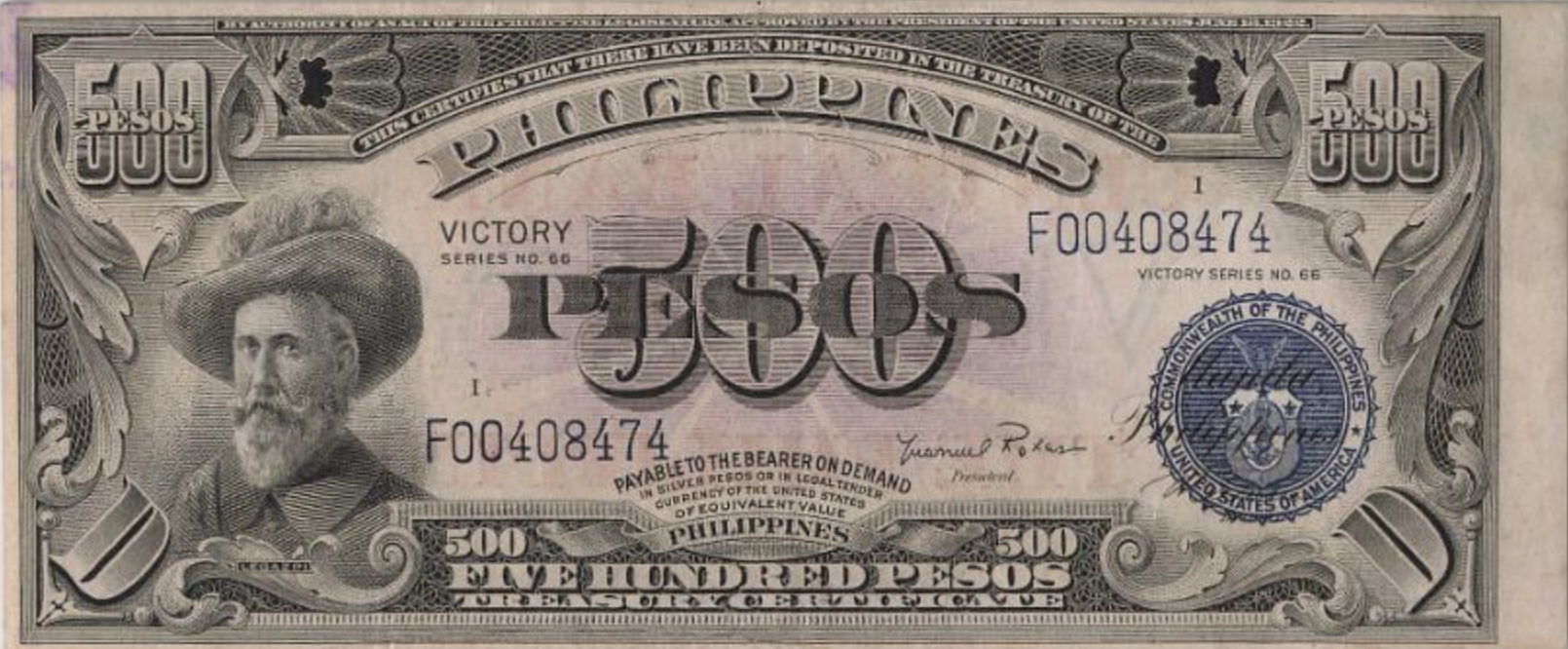
500 Philippine pesos victory CBP banknote obverse

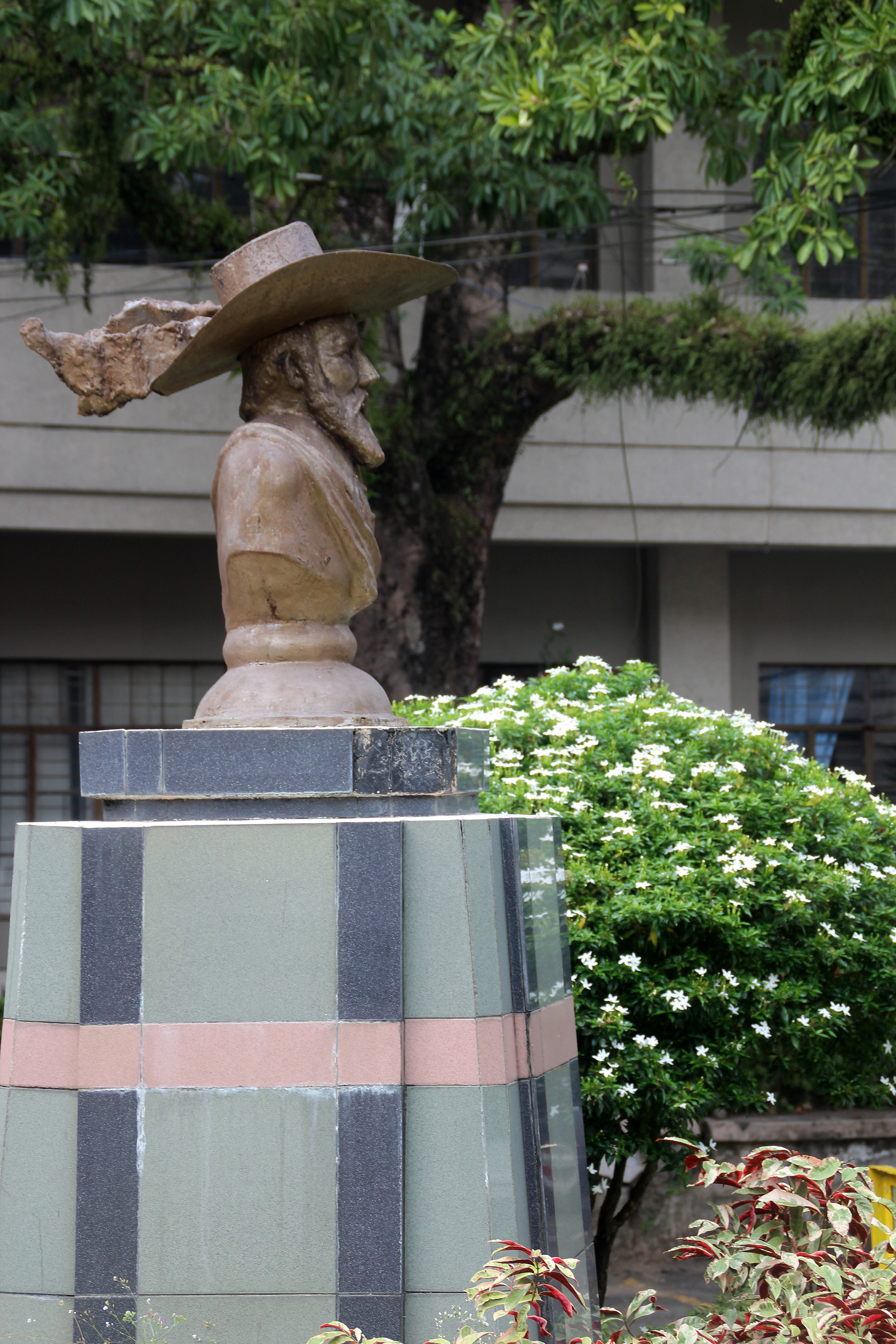
Monument of López de Legazpi at the city hall of the Philippine city named after him. Legazpi City, Albay

== See also ==
- History of the Philippines

== Bibliography ==
- Blair, Emma Helen, ed. (1903). "Resume of Contemporaneous Documents, 1559–68. (Expeditions of Legaspi)". The Philippine Islands, 1493–1803. Vol. 2, 1521–1569. Cleveland, Ohio: Arthur H. Clark. pp. 77–329.
- Cushner, Nicholas P. (1965). "Legazpi 1564–1572". Philippine Studies. 13 (2): 163–206. ISSN 0031-7837. JSTOR 42720592.
- De Morga, Antonio (2004). History of the Philippine Islands. Volume 1 and 2. Project Gutenberg.
- Fernández, Leoncio Cabrero. "Miguel López de Legazpi". Real Academia de la Historia.
- Howgego, Raymond John, ed. (2003). "Legazpi, Miguel Lopez de". Encyclopedia of Exploration to 1800. Hordern House. ISBN 1875567364.
- Kelsey, Harry (2016). The First Circumnavigators : Unsung Heroes of the Age of Discovery. New Haven. ISBN 978-0-300-22086-5.
- Mitchell, Mairin (1964). Friar Andrés de Urdaneta, O.S.A. (1508–1568) Pioneer of Pacific Navigation from West to East. London: Macdonald and Evans.
- Pisano, Nicholas D. (1992). The Spanish Pacification of the Philippines, 1565–1600 (PDF) (Masters thesis). US Army Command and General Staff College.
- Rodríguez, Isacio R. (1965). "A Bibliography on Legazpi and Urdaneta and their Joint Expedition". Philippine Studies. 13 (2): 287–329. ISSN 0031-7837. JSTOR 42720596.

Government offices
New office	Governor and Captain-General of the Philippines; 1565–1572	Succeeded by Guido de Lavezaris
Honorary titles
Preceded by Pedro Menéndez de Avilés	El adelantado 1571–1572	Honorary disestablished
