= Symbols of León, Guanajuato =

The symbols of León, Guanajuato, Mexico, were officially adopted as symbols of the municipality in 2003.

== Coat of arms ==
Seal of City of León.

The emblem of León presents four quarters on a background of acanthus leaves, crowned by five towers which in heraldry accredit the title of city. The upper quarter on the left has a representation of Saint Sebastian, patron saint of the city. The next quarter shows the rampant red lion of the Kingdom of León. The third, in the lower left, presents the Coat of Arms of Don Martín Enríquez de Almansa, and the last a honeycomb with bees that indicates the industriousness of the Leonese.

The motto LABOR OMNIA VINCIT began to be used under the emblem in the 1930s. It was translated to EL TRABAJO TODO LO VENCE (Work conquers all) during the 1983-1985 administration.

== Flag ==
León
- Use: Civil and state flag
- Proportion: 2:3

The flag of León consists of a green rectangle with a ratio of two to three between the width and golden border; in the center it bears the Municipal Coat of arms, placed in such a way that it occupies three-quarters of the width, below which is the caption MUNICIPIO DE LEÓN, GTO (Municipality of Leon, Guanajuato).
