= Luis Carrillo =

Luis Carrillo was, from November 1567 to about July 1568, royal commissioner with Alonso Muñoz for the inspection of the viceregal government of New Spain for King Philip II.

== The Conspiracy of 1565 ==
When New Spain Viceroy Luís de Velasco died in 1564, the cabildo (city council) of Mexico City informed Spain they did not want another viceroy. Word that the Council of the Indies in Spain would not agree to make encomiendas permanent led to a conspiracy to make New Spain independent of the mother country. In 1565, Martín Cortés, Marquess del Valle, son and heir of Hernán Cortés, and Luis, another son, were the leaders of this conspiracy.

The plot was discovered and suppressed, and some of the conspirators, including the sons of Cortés, were arrested. In 1566, before the arrival of the new viceroy, Gastón de Peralta, marqués de Falces, the Audiencia had had two conspirators beheaded. These were the brothers Alonso and Gil Gonzales de Avila. The Audiencia had also sentenced Martín and Luis Cortés to death, but the sentence had not yet been carried out. Upon his arrival, Viceroy Peralta reviewed the cases and suspended the death sentences against the sons of Cortés. They were sent back to Spain to be dealt with by the Council of the Indies. The Audiencia denounced the new viceroy for his leniency with the rebels.

== As royal commissioner in New Spain ==
Conflicting reports sent back to Spain led to confusion in the Council of the Indies. The Council proposed to the king that he send a special commission to the colony to investigate the situation and bring actions against guilty parties, up to and including the removal of the viceroy. By a royal edict dated June 16, 1567, Philip II named a commission consisting of Licenciado Gaspar de Jarava, Licenciado Alonso Muñoz and Doctor Luis Carrillo. The first two were from the Council of the Indies; Doctor Carrillo was an official in the Court.

The king gave written instructions to the commissioners. They were to order Viceroy Peralta to return to Spain at the first opportunity. The government of the colony was to be turned over to Licenciado Jarava, the oldest of the three commissioners, and in his absence, to Licenciado Muñoz, also elderly. Sentences of death were not to be given without the unanimous approval of the commissioners.

Commissioner Jarava died on the voyage, on July 18, 1567, one day after reaching Grand Canary. Muñoz and Carrillo arrived in Veracruz on October 29, 1567. They began their work in Mexico City early in November. The Audiencia had already freed Martín Cortés on condition that he would leave Mexico. The first decision of the commission was to construct a jail, "in the manner of those of the Santo Officio [Inquisition]", to imprison the principle accused, including Baltasar de Aguilar Cervantes and Luis Cortés.

Aguilar was the principal accuser of Martín Cortes, Marquess del Valle, but upon recognizing Viceroy Peralta's sympathy with the marquess, Aguilar had withdrawn his accusations. He was arrested now and subjected to torture to determine which of his accounts was the true one. Under torture he admitted that the second version, favorable to Cortés, was meant to persuade the viceroy. He was condemned to ten years in the galleys, forfeiture of his property, and perpetual exile from the Indies. Also tried were the brothers Pedro and Baltazar de Quesada.

Many others were implicated, some of them innocent. They were arrested, often tortured, and sentenced to prison, confiscation of property or exile. In 1568 three were hanged. The jails were full and new jails were constructed. Muñoz and Carrillo continued to jail innocent people until Spain, acting on petitions from the colonists, ordered their recall. Martín Cortés's property was restored in 1574, except for Tehuantepec, which was taken by the Crown for a port and navy yard.

== Embarkation for Spain ==
Doctor Carrillo left to return to Spain in 1568, accompanied by some of the prisoners being transferred there. Muñoz remained in Mexico City in accordance with his instructions from the king, to continue as interim governor of the colony until the arrival of a new viceroy. When Carrillo arrived in the port of Veracruz, he found the deposed viceroy waiting to embark for Spain. He also found a newly arrived ship with further instructions. Both commissioners were ordered to return to Spain immediately and the government of the colony was left in charge of the Audiencia. Muñoz, who was not anxious to leave, nevertheless went to Veracruz and embarked with Carrillo, ex-Viceroy Peralta, and the prisoners.

Carrillo died on the voyage from Veracruz to Havana. He was buried in Cuba, but later exhumed so that his remains could be returned to Spain. The Audiencia of Mexico City under its president Francisco Ceinos continued to govern there until November. In that month the new viceroy, Martín Enríquez de Almanza, arrived and took over the administration.

Muñoz, the only survivor of the three commissioners, gave the formal report of the mission to the king in late August, 1568. He died on December 19, 1568.

== See also ==
- List of Viceroys of New Spain
