= Blockade of Cebu =

Failed Portuguese naval action in 1568

- Part of the Portuguese–Spanish colonial rivalry
- Cebu highlighted in red
Date	31 October 1568 – 1 January 1569
Location	Cebu (present-day Cebu City), Captaincy General of the Philippines
Result	Spanish victory

Belligerents
Spanish Empire	Portuguese Empire

Commanders and leaders
(Spanish Empire) Miguel López de Legazpi	(Portuguese Empire) Gonzalo Pereira

The Blockade of Cebu was a failed Portuguese naval action against the Spanish colony in the present-day city of Cebu, Philippines in 1568. The Portuguese fleet under captain-general Gonzalo Pereira blockaded Cebu in an effort to starve and expel the Spanish. However, the Spanish colony proved to be resistant to the blockade and the Portuguese fleet eventually suffered from typhoid fever. Pereira then decided to lift the blockade and sail the fleet to the Maluku Islands.

== Background ==
In 1494, the Treaty of Tordesillas divided the lands outside of Europe in half between Spain and Portugal. The Spaniards obtained the Americas (except Brazil) and the Pacific while the Portuguese acquired Africa and parts of Asia. However, the Philippines was not mentioned in the treaty. The Spaniards originally ignored the islands because it was well west of their territorial claims.

Charles V, monarch of Spain and the Holy Roman Empire, authorized an expedition by Ferdinand Magellan, who conducted the first circumnavigation of the world. The objective of the expedition was to find an alternative route to Asia. Magellan was ultimately killed during the Battle of Mactan in 1521.

It was during the reign of Charles's son, Philip II, that Spain decided to colonize the Philippines. Philip thought that Portugal would not protest as the islands were not abundant in spices. An expedition led by Miguel López de Legazpi successfully established in 1565 a Spanish colonial settlement in Cebu. When King Sebastian of Portugal learned of Legazpi's colony, he sent captain-general Gonzalo Pereira to expel the Spaniards.

== Blockade ==
On September 18, 1568, a Portuguese vessel arrived in Cebu with letters from Pereira announcing his imminent arrival. Ten days later, a fleet manned by Portuguese and Moluccan sailors appeared on the horizon. Pereira sent messages to Legazpi asserting that the islands lay on their side of the demarcation line that divided the globe between Spain and Portugal. The Portuguese threatened to attack if the Spaniards did not abandon their colony but Legazpi refused their demands. The last communication between Legazpi and Pereira was on October 31. Faced with the risk of being blamed for hostilities, Pereira decided to blockade Cebu instead of directly attacking it.

During the following months, the Portuguese ships fired upon neighboring villages and killed native inhabitants, including women and children. When it became clear that the Spaniards would not leave the Philippines and with the Portuguese fleet suffering from typhoid fever, Pereira lifted the blockade on New Year's Day in 1569 and sailed to the Maluku Islands.

== Aftermath ==
After the Portuguese blockade, Legazpi held a general meeting of officers and priests. They agreed that a second Spanish settlement should be established in Panay due to its plentiful food supply and several outlets to the sea. It was on the bank of the Panay River that the Spaniards founded what is present-day Roxas City in 1569.

Legazpi would subsequently transfer the colonial government to Manila, which he proclaimed to be the new capital of the Spanish East Indies in 1571.
