= Luis de Villanueva y Zapata =

Spanish colonial administrator

Doctor Luis de Villanueva y Zapata was a Spanish colonial administrator in New Spain.

== Biography ==
He studied at the University of Salamanca. He married Mariana de Sandoval, daughter of Pedro de Sandoval and Isabel Ortiz.

He was an oidor (judge) in the Audiencia of Mexico. Visitador (Inspector) Valderrama once suspended him from this office for abuse of power.

On the death of Viceroy Lorenzo Suárez de Mendoza in June 1583, Villanueva y Zapata became acting viceroy of the colony in virtue of his position as dean of the Audiencia. This made him the royal official in charge of Spanish possessions north of Peru, including both present-day Mexico and Central America (except for Panama). This was a difficult period for the government, which had to combat a sense of insecurity in the colony. Villanueva served in this capacity through September 24, 1584, when the new viceroy, Pedro Moya de Contreras, officially took over the office. Moya de Contreras had been visitador at the time of the death of Suárez de Mendoza, and in this capacity he exercised considerable influence even before becoming viceroy.

== See also ==
- List of Viceroys of New Spain
