= Lorenzo Suárez de Mendoza, 5th Count of Coruña =

Mexican politician (c. 1518 – 1583)

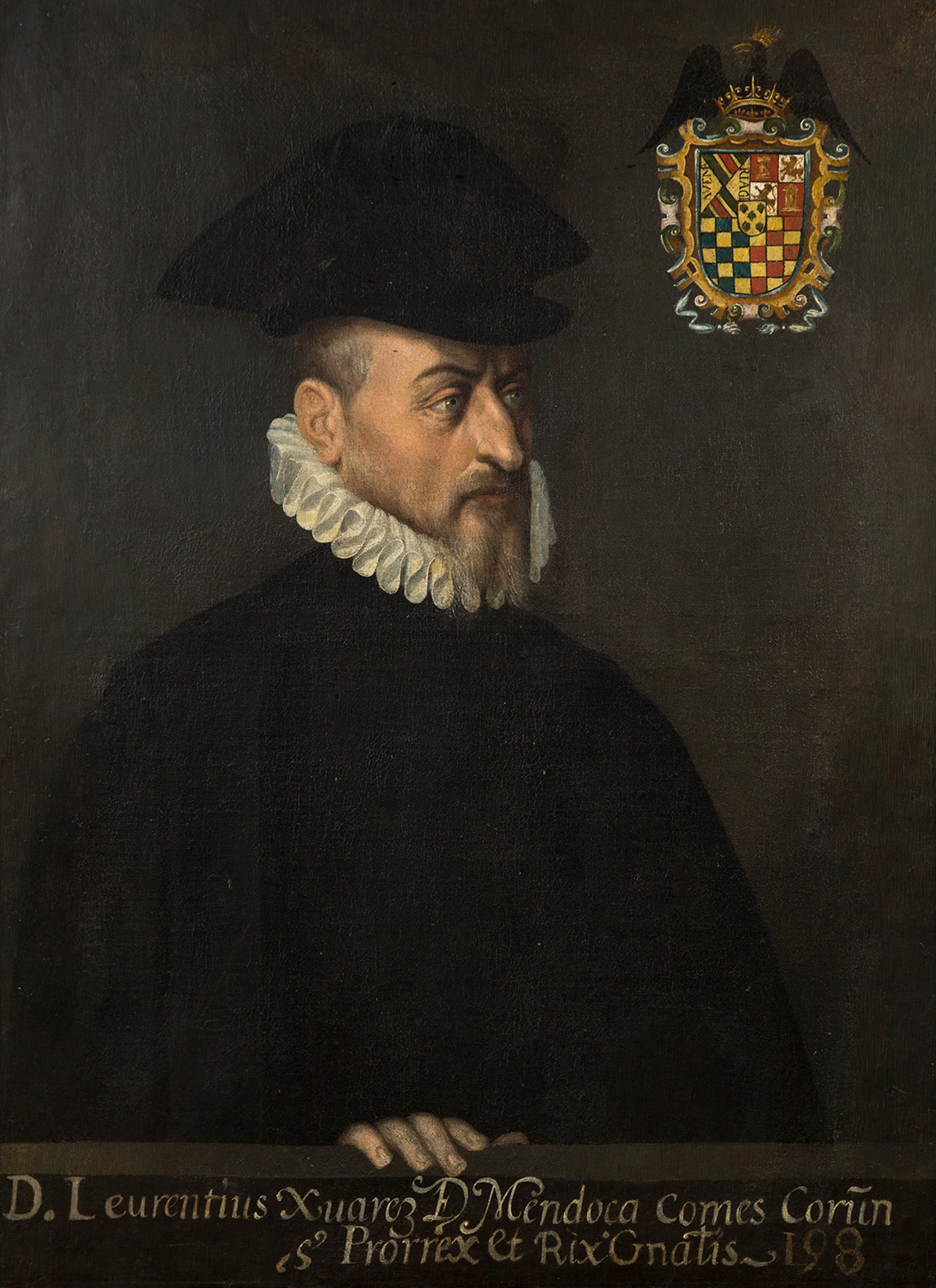

5th Viceroy of New Spain
- In office October 4, 1580 – June 29, 1583
- Preceded by: Martín Enríquez de Almanza
- Succeeded by: Luis de Villanueva y Zapata (acting)

Personal details
- Born: c. 1518; Guadalajara, Habsburg Spain
- Died: June 29, 1583; Mexico City, New Spain
- Relatives: Íñigo López de Mendoza, 1st Marquis of Santillana; Antonio de Mendoza (cousin)

Lorenzo Suárez de Mendoza, 5th Count of Coruña (Spanish: Lorenzo Suárez de Mendoza, quinto conde de Coruña) (c. 1518, Guadalajara, Spain – June 29, 1583, Mexico City) was the fifth viceroy of New Spain, who governed from October 4, 1580 to June 29, 1583. He was born into the old nobility of Spain, being a direct descendant of Íñigo López de Mendoza, 1st Marquess of Santillana, and a second cousin of Antonio de Mendoza, the first viceroy of New Spain.

== Early life ==
Suárez de Mendoza was a man of letters, a writer of merit. He received praise for his novel El pastor de Filida. He participated in the war and conquest of Tunis, where he was taken by his father, who accompanied the emperor. He was patron and protector of the Universidad de Alcalá de Henares.

== Appointment and arrival ==
On March 26, 1580, he was named viceroy by King Philip II, to replace the previous viceroy, Martín Enríquez de Almanza, who was leaving to become viceroy of Peru. Suárez de Mendoza made his solemn entry into Mexico City on October 4, 1580, formally taking up the administration of New Spain. He was received there in more pomp than had previously been seen on such occasions. His amiable character and the attention he paid to public business soon made him a popular figure.

== Accomplishments ==
As an honest and upright man, one of his major concerns was ending widespread vice and administrative corruption, which had reached enormous proportions. Members of the Audiencia, government officials, judges and bureaucrats sold their services and their decisions. Suárez attempted to stop such abuses with some, but not total, success. He was limited because some of his actions required approval by the Audiencia. In order to combat the obstructions of the Audiencia, he asked Philip to name a visitador (inspector). This important position was given to Pedro Moya de Contreras, the first inquisitor general of New Spain, and now also archbishop of Mexico City. Moya de Contreras succeeded Suárez as viceroy after the latter's death in 1583.

In order to regulate commercial affairs and to supervise the two grand fairs, at Acapulco and Veracruz, Suárez instituted the Tribunal del Comercio (Commercial Tribunal), known also as the Consulado.

== Death and succession ==
Suárez de Mendoza, already elderly when he took up the office, did not survive three years as viceroy. He died on June 29, 1583, in the capital of the viceroyalty. His remains were deposited in the Church of San Francisco, and later transferred to Spain for interment in his family tomb. The Audiencia took up the government of New Spain pending the appointment of a new viceroy. The Audiencia at this time included Dr. Robles, Lic. Sánchez Paredes, and Don Pedro Farfán. This interim government was confronted with major difficulties, and its 16 months in power was a period of insecurity. In 1584 the new viceroy, Archbishop Moya de Contreras, took over the government.

== See also ==
- Luis de Villanueva y Zapata
