= List of viceroys of New Spain =

Viceroy of New Spain
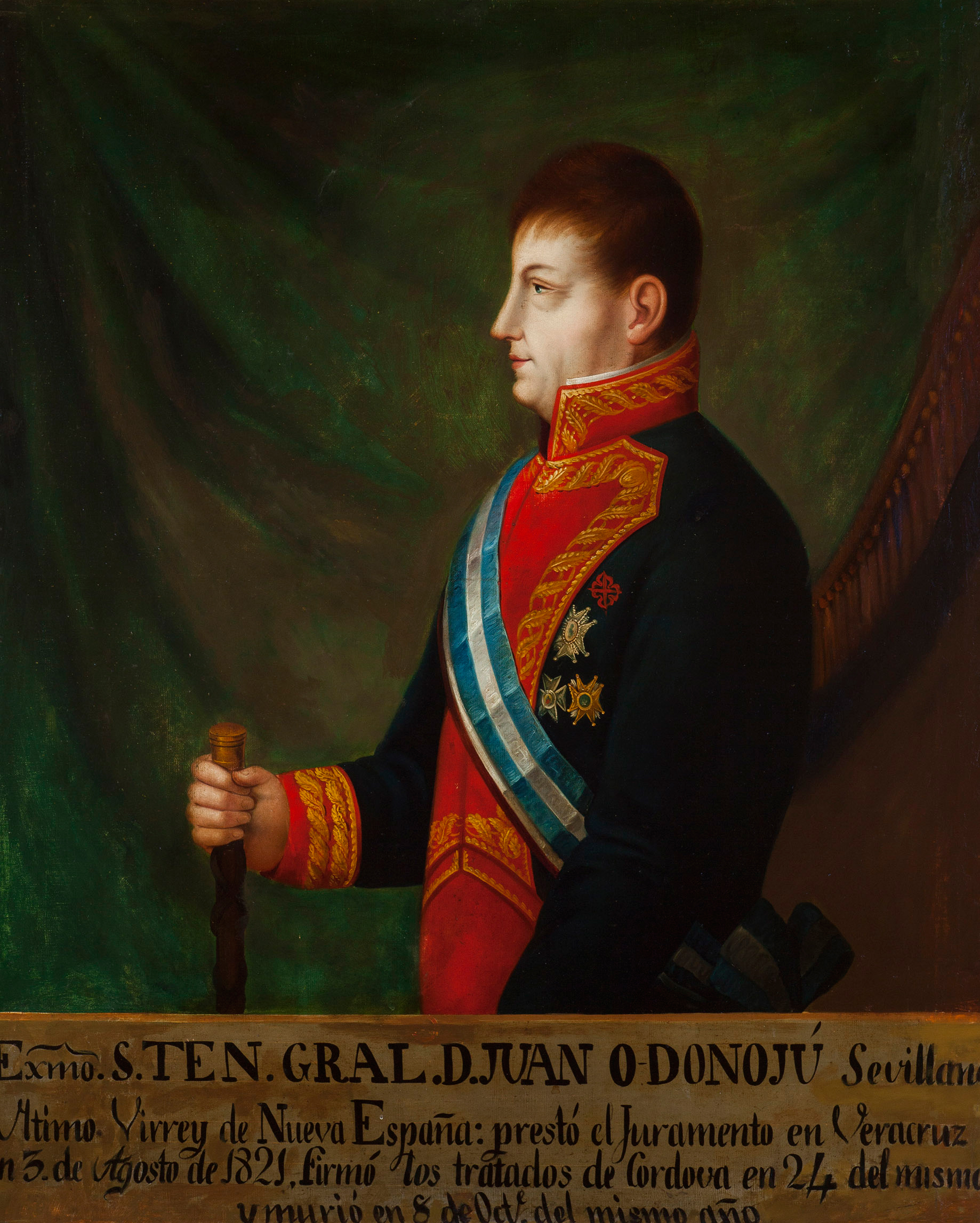
- last to reign: Juan O'Donojú
- Residence: Palace of the Viceroy
- Appointer: King of Spain
- Formation: 14 November 1535
- First holder: Antonio de Mendoza
- Final holder: Juan O'Donojú
- Abolished: 28 September 1821

This article lists the viceroys who ruled the Viceroyalty of New Spain from 1535 to 1821 in the name of the monarch of Spain.

In addition to viceroys, this article lists the highest Spanish governors of the viceroyalty, before the appointment of the first viceroy or when the office of viceroy was vacant. Most of these individuals exercised most or all of the functions of viceroy, usually on an interim basis.

== Governor of the Spanish Indies ==
This office covered the territories that were discovered by Christopher Columbus.

1492–1499: Christopher Columbus, as governor and viceroy of the West Indies
1499–1502: Francisco de Bobadilla, as governor of the West Indies
1502–1509: Nicolás de Ovando, as governor of the West Indies
1509–1518: Diego Columbus, as governor of the West Indies until 1511, thereafter as viceroy

== Governor of New Spain ==
This office covered the territories that were claimed by Hernán Cortés. The office covered the territories that were under the control of the Governor of the Indies after 1524.

13 August 1521 – 24 December 1521: Hernán Cortés
24 December 1521 – 30 December 1521: Cristóbal de Tapia
30 December 1521 – 12 October 1524: Hernán Cortés, as governor and captain general from 15 October 1522
12 October 1524 – 29 December 1524: Alonso de Estrada, Rodrigo de Albornoz, Alonso de Zuazo
29 December 1524 – 17 February 1525: Gonzalo de Salazar, Pedro Almíndez Chirino, Alonso de Zuazo
17 February 1525 – 20 April 1525: Gonzalo de Salazar, Pedro Almíndez Chirino, Alonso de Estrada, Rodrigo de Albornoz, Alonso de Zuazo
20 April 1525 – 23 May 1525: Gonzalo de Salazar, Pedro Almíndez Chirino, Alonso de Zuazo
24 May 1525 – 28 January 1526: Gonzalo de Salazar, Pedro Almíndez Chirino
29 January 1526 – 24 June 1526: Alonso de Estrada, Rodrigo de Albornoz
25 June 1526 – 3 July 1526: Hernán Cortés
4 July 1526 – 16 July 1526: Luis Ponce de León
16 July 1526 – 1 March 1527: Marcos de Aguilar
2 March 1527 – 22 August 1527: Alonso de Estrada, Gonzalo de Sandoval, Luis de la Torre
22 August 1527 – 8 December 1528: Alonso de Estrada, Luis de la Torre
9 December 1528 – 21 December 1529: Nuño Beltrán de Guzmán, Juan Ortiz de Matienzo, Diego Delgadillo (the first Audiencia)
21 December 1529 – 9 January 1531: Juan Ortiz de Matienzo, Diego Delgadillo (the first Audiencia)
10 January 1531 – 16 April 1535: Sebastián Ramírez de Fuenleal, Vasco de Quiroga, Juan de Salmerón, Alonso de Maldonado, Francisco Ceinos (the second Audiencia)

== Viceroys of New Spain (1535–1821) ==
The first Viceroy of New Spain was appointed in 1535 to consolidate the offices of the Governor of the Indies and the Governor of New Spain into a single office.

| No. | Portrait | Governor | From | Until | Secretary of the Indies (Note: Depending secretariat of the colony) | Valido Secretary of the Universal Bureau First Secretary of State | Regent | Monarch |
|---|---|---|---|---|---|---|---|---|
| 1 | | Antonio de Mendoza | 14 November 1535 | 25 November 1550 | Vacant (Overseas Affairs hold by the President of the Council of the Indies) | No valido | No regency | Charles I |
| 2 | | Luís de Velasco | 25 November 1550 | 31 July 1564 | Vacant (Overseas Affairs hold by the President of the Council of the Indies) | No valido | No regency | Charles I |
| 2 | | Luís de Velasco | 25 November 1550 | 31 July 1564 | Vacant (Overseas Affairs hold by the President of the Council of the Indies) | No valido | No regency | Philip II |
| Int. | | Francisco Ceinos, Dean of the Audiencia | 1 August 1564 | 19 October 1566 | Vacant (Overseas Affairs hold by the President of the Council of the Indies) | No valido | No regency | Philip II |
| 3 | | Gastón Carrillo de Peralta y Bosquete, 3rd Marquess of Falces | 19 October 1566 | 11 November 1567 | Vacant (Overseas Affairs hold by the President of the Council of the Indies) | No valido | No regency | Philip II |
| Acting | | Alonso de Muñoz, Royal commissioner of New Spain | 11 November 1567 | 15 April 1568 | Vacant (Overseas Affairs hold by the President of the Council of the Indies) | No valido | No regency | Philip II |
| Acting | | Luis Carrillo, Royal commissioner of New Spain | 11 November 1567 | 15 April 1568 | Vacant (Overseas Affairs hold by the President of the Council of the Indies) | No valido | No regency | Philip II |
| Acting | | Francisco Ceinos, Dean of the Audiencia | 15 April 1568 | 5 November 1568 | Vacant (Overseas Affairs hold by the President of the Council of the Indies) | No valido | No regency | Philip II |
| 4 | | Martín Enríquez de Almanza | 5 November 1568 | 4 October 1580 | Vacant (Overseas Affairs hold by the President of the Council of the Indies) | No valido | No regency | Philip II |
| 5 | | Lorenzo Suárez de Mendoza, 4th Count of La Coruña | 4 October 1580 | 19 June 1583 | Vacant (Overseas Affairs hold by the President of the Council of the Indies) | No valido | No regency | Philip II |
| Int. | | Luis de Villanueva y Zapata, Dean of the Audiencia | 19 June 1583 | 25 September 1584 | Vacant (Overseas Affairs hold by the President of the Council of the Indies) | No valido | No regency | Philip II |
| 6 | | Pedro de Moya y Contrerás (Archbishop of Mexico) | 25 September 1584 | 17 October 1585 | Vacant (Overseas Affairs hold by the President of the Council of the Indies) | No valido | No regency | Philip II |
| 7 | | Álvaro Manrique de Zúñiga; 1st Marquess of Villamanrique | 17 October 1585 | 27 January 1590 | Vacant (Overseas Affairs hold by the President of the Council of the Indies) | No valido | No regency | Philip II |
| 8 | | Luís de Velasco; Marquess of Salinas | 27 January 1590 | 5 November 1595 | Vacant (Overseas Affairs hold by the President of the Council of the Indies) | No valido | No regency | Philip II |
| 9 | | Gaspar de Zúñiga Acevedo y Fonseca, 5th Count of Monterrey | 5 November 1595 | 27 October 1603 | Vacant (Overseas Affairs hold by the President of the Council of the Indies) | No valido | No regency | Philip II |
| 9 | | Gaspar de Zúñiga Acevedo y Fonseca, 5th Count of Monterrey | 5 November 1595 | 27 October 1603 | Vacant (Overseas Affairs hold by the President of the Council of the Indies) | Duke of Lerma (Note: As valido of the King of Spain) | No regency | Philip III |
| 10 | | Juan de Mendoza y Luna, Marquess of Montesclaros | 27 October 1603 | 2 July 1607 | Vacant (Overseas Affairs hold by the President of the Council of the Indies) | Duke of Lerma | No regency | Philip III |
| 11 | | Luís de Velasco, Marquess of Salinas | 2 July 1607 | 19 June 1611 | Vacant (Overseas Affairs hold by the President of the Council of the Indies) | Duke of Lerma | No regency | Philip III |
| 12 | | García Guerra, O.P. (Archbishop of Mexico) | 19 June 1611 | 22 February 1612 | Vacant (Overseas Affairs hold by the President of the Council of the Indies) | Duke of Lerma | No regency | Philip III |
| Int. | | Pedro Otárola, Dean of the Audiencia | 22 February 1612 | 18 October 1612 | Vacant (Overseas Affairs hold by the President of the Council of the Indies) | Duke of Lerma | No regency | Philip III |
| 13 | | Diego Fernández de Córdoba, Marquess of Guadalcázar and Count of Posadas | 18 October 1612 | 14 March 1621 | Vacant (Overseas Affairs hold by the President of the Council of the Indies) | Duke of Lerma | No regency | Philip III |
| 13 | | Diego Fernández de Córdoba, Marquess of Guadalcázar and Count of Posadas | 18 October 1612 | 14 March 1621 | Vacant (Overseas Affairs hold by the President of the Council of the Indies) | Cristóbal Gómez de Sandoval | No regency | Philip III |
| Acting | | Paz de Valecillo, Dean of the Audiencia | 14 March 1621 | 11 September 1621 | Vacant (Overseas Affairs hold by the President of the Council of the Indies) | Cristóbal Gómez de Sandoval | No regency | Philip III |
| Acting | | Paz de Valecillo, Dean of the Audiencia | 14 March 1621 | 11 September 1621 | Vacant (Overseas Affairs hold by the President of the Council of the Indies) | Baltasar de Zúñiga | No regency | Philip IV |
| 14 | | Diego Carrillo de Mendoza y Pimentel, 1st Marquess of Gélves | 21 September 1621 | 1 November 1624 | Vacant (Overseas Affairs hold by the President of the Council of the Indies) | Baltasar de Zúñiga | No regency | Philip IV |
| 14 | | Diego Carrillo de Mendoza y Pimentel, 1st Marquess of Gélves | 21 September 1621 | 1 November 1624 | Vacant (Overseas Affairs hold by the President of the Council of the Indies) | Count-Duke of Olivares | No regency | Philip IV |
| Vacant; Due to the discrepancy on the arrival of successor Viceroy from 1 to 3 November 1624. | | | | | Vacant (Overseas Affairs hold by the President of the Council of the Indies) | Count-Duke of Olivares | No regency | Philip IV |
| 15 | | Rodrigo Pacheco y Osorio de Toledo, 3rd Marquess of Cerralvo | 3 November 1624 | 16 September 1635 | Vacant (Overseas Affairs hold by the President of the Council of the Indies) | Count-Duke of Olivares | No regency | Philip IV |
| 16 | | Lope Díez de Aux de Armendáriz, Marquess of Cadreita | 16 September 1635 | 28 August 1640 | Vacant (Overseas Affairs hold by the President of the Council of the Indies) | Count-Duke of Olivares | No regency | Philip IV |
| 17 | | Diego Roque López Pacheco Cabrera y Bobadilla, 7th Duke of Escalona, 7th Marquess of Villena and 7th Count of Xiquena | 28 August 1640 | 10 June 1642 | Vacant (Overseas Affairs hold by the President of the Council of the Indies) | Count-Duke of Olivares | No regency | Philip IV |
| 18 | | Juan de Palafox y Mendoza (Bishop of Puebla) | 10 June 1642 | 23 November 1642 | Vacant (Overseas Affairs hold by the President of the Council of the Indies) | Count-Duke of Olivares | No regency | Philip IV |
| 19 | | García Sarmiento de Sotomayor, 2nd Count of Salvatierra and Marquess of Sobroso | 23 November 1642 | 14 May 1648 | Vacant (Overseas Affairs hold by the President of the Council of the Indies) | Count-Duke of Olivares | No regency | Philip IV |
| 19 | | García Sarmiento de Sotomayor, 2nd Count of Salvatierra and Marquess of Sobroso | 23 November 1642 | 14 May 1648 | Vacant (Overseas Affairs hold by the President of the Council of the Indies) | Luis de Haro | No regency | Philip IV |
| 20 | | Marcos de Torres y Rueda (Bishop of Yucatan) | 15 May 1648 | 22 April 1649 | Vacant (Overseas Affairs hold by the President of the Council of the Indies) | Luis de Haro | No regency | Philip IV |
| Int. | | Matías de Peralta, Dean of the Audiencia | 22 April 1649 | 28 June 1650 | Vacant (Overseas Affairs hold by the President of the Council of the Indies) | Luis de Haro | No regency | Philip IV |
| 21 | | Luis Enríquez de Guzmán, 9th Count of Alba de Liste and Marquess of Villaflor | 28 June 1650 | 15 August 1653 | Vacant (Overseas Affairs hold by the President of the Council of the Indies) | Luis de Haro | No regency | Philip IV |
| 22 | | Francisco Fernández de la Cueva, 8th Duke of Alburquerque, Marquess of Cuéllar, Count of Ledesma and of Huelma | 15 August 1653 | 16 September 1660 | Vacant (Overseas Affairs hold by the President of the Council of the Indies) | Luis de Haro | No regency | Philip IV |
| 23 | | Juan de Leyva de la Cerda, Marquess of Adrada | 16 September 1660 | 29 June 1664 | Vacant (Overseas Affairs hold by the President of the Council of the Indies) | Luis de Haro | No regency | Philip IV |
| 23 | | Juan de Leyva de la Cerda, Marquess of Adrada | 16 September 1660 | 29 June 1664 | Vacant (Overseas Affairs hold by the President of the Council of the Indies) | No valido (Note: Personalist government of Philip IV) | No regency | Philip IV |
| 24 | | Diego Osorio de Escobar y Llamas (Bishop of Puebla) | 29 June 1664 | 15 October 1664 | Vacant (Overseas Affairs hold by the President of the Council of the Indies) | No valido | No regency | Philip IV |
| 25 | | Antonio Sebastián de Toledo Molina y Salazar, 2nd Marquess of Mancera | 16 October 1664 | 20 November 1673 | Vacant (Overseas Affairs hold by the President of the Council of the Indies) | No valido | No regency | Philip IV |
| 25 | | Antonio Sebastián de Toledo Molina y Salazar, 2nd Marquess of Mancera | 16 October 1664 | 20 November 1673 | Vacant (Overseas Affairs hold by the President of the Council of the Indies) | Juan Everardo Nithard | Mariana of Austria (Note: As regent during the minority of his son, Charles II) | Charles II |
| 25 | | Antonio Sebastián de Toledo Molina y Salazar, 2nd Marquess of Mancera | 16 October 1664 | 20 November 1673 | Vacant (Overseas Affairs hold by the President of the Council of the Indies) | Fernando de Valenzuela | Mariana of Austria | Charles II |
| 26 | | Pedro Nuño Colón de Portugal y Castro, 6th Duke of Veragua, 6th Marquess of Jamaica and 6th Count of Gelves | 20 November 1673 | 13 December 1673 | Vacant (Overseas Affairs hold by the President of the Council of the Indies) | Fernando de Valenzuela | Mariana of Austria | Charles II |
| 27 | | Payo Enríquez de Rivera Manrique, O.S.A. (Bishop of Guatemala and Archbishop of Mexico) | 13 December 1673 | 7 November 1680 | Vacant (Overseas Affairs hold by the President of the Council of the Indies) | Fernando de Valenzuela | Mariana of Austria | Charles II |
| 27 | | Payo Enríquez de Rivera Manrique, O.S.A. (Bishop of Guatemala and Archbishop of Mexico) | 13 December 1673 | 7 November 1680 | Vacant (Overseas Affairs hold by the President of the Council of the Indies) | Fernando de Valenzuela | No regency | Charles II |
| 27 | | Payo Enríquez de Rivera Manrique, O.S.A. (Bishop of Guatemala and Archbishop of Mexico) | 13 December 1673 | 7 November 1680 | Vacant (Overseas Affairs hold by the President of the Council of the Indies) | John Joseph of Austria (Note: As Chief Minister of Spain) | No regency | Charles II |
| 27 | | Payo Enríquez de Rivera Manrique, O.S.A. (Bishop of Guatemala and Archbishop of Mexico) | 13 December 1673 | 7 November 1680 | Vacant (Overseas Affairs hold by the President of the Council of the Indies) | Duke of Medinaceli | No regency | Charles II |
| 28 | | Tomás Antonio Manuel Lorenzo de la Cerda y Aragón; 3rd Marquess of La Laguna de Camero Viejo | 7 November 1680 | 16 June 1686 | Vacant (Overseas Affairs hold by the President of the Council of the Indies) | Duke of Medinaceli | No regency | Charles II |
| 28 | | Tomás Antonio Manuel Lorenzo de la Cerda y Aragón; 3rd Marquess of La Laguna de Camero Viejo | 7 November 1680 | 16 June 1686 | Vacant (Overseas Affairs hold by the President of the Council of the Indies) | Count of Oropesa | No regency | Charles II |
| 29 | | Melchor Portocarrero y Lasso de la Vega, 3rd Count of Monclova | 16 June 1686 | 20 November 1688 | Vacant (Overseas Affairs hold by the President of the Council of the Indies) | Count of Oropesa | No regency | Charles II |
| 30 | | Gaspar Melchor Baltasar de la Cerda Silva Sandoval y Mendoza, 8th Count of Galve, Lord of Salcedón and Tortola | 20 November 1688 | 27 February 1696 | Vacant (Overseas Affairs hold by the President of the Council of the Indies) | Count of Oropesa | No regency | Charles II |
| 30 | | Gaspar Melchor Baltasar de la Cerda Silva Sandoval y Mendoza, 8th Count of Galve, Lord of Salcedón and Tortola | 20 November 1688 | 27 February 1696 | Vacant (Overseas Affairs hold by the President of the Council of the Indies) | No valido (Note: After the dimission of Count of Oropesa, there wasn't any powerful person) | No regency | Charles II |
| 31 | | Juan de Ortega Cano Montañez y Patiño (Bishop of Durango, Guatemala, Michoacán and Archbishop of Mexico) | 27 February 1696 | 18 December 1696 | Vacant (Overseas Affairs hold by the President of the Council of the Indies) | No valido | No regency | Charles II |
| 32 | | José Sarmiento Valladares Arines de Romay, 1st Duke of Atrisco, Count of Moctezuma and of Tula | 18 December 1696 | 4 November 1701 | Vacant (Overseas Affairs hold by the President of the Council of the Indies) | No valido | No regency | Charles II |
| 32 | | José Sarmiento Valladares Arines de Romay, 1st Duke of Atrisco, Count of Moctezuma and of Tula | 18 December 1696 | 4 November 1701 | Vacant (Overseas Affairs hold by the President of the Council of the Indies) | Count of Oropesa | No regency | Charles II |
| 32 | | José Sarmiento Valladares Arines de Romay, 1st Duke of Atrisco, Count of Moctezuma and of Tula | 18 December 1696 | 4 November 1701 | Vacant (Overseas Affairs hold by the President of the Council of the Indies) | Cardinal Portocarrero | No regency | Charles II |
| 32 | | José Sarmiento Valladares Arines de Romay, 1st Duke of Atrisco, Count of Moctezuma and of Tula | 18 December 1696 | 4 November 1701 | Vacant (Overseas Affairs hold by the President of the Council of the Indies) | Cardinal Portocarrero | Cardinal Portocarrero (Note: During the illness of Charles II) | Charles II |
| 32 | | José Sarmiento Valladares Arines de Romay, 1st Duke of Atrisco, Count of Moctezuma and of Tula | 18 December 1696 | 4 November 1701 | Vacant (Overseas Affairs hold by the President of the Council of the Indies) | Cardinal Portocarrero | Government Board of the Realms (Note: After the death of Charles II) | Vacant (Note: Until the coronation of Philip of Anjou) |
| 32 | | José Sarmiento Valladares Arines de Romay, 1st Duke of Atrisco, Count of Moctezuma and of Tula | 18 December 1696 | 4 November 1701 | Vacant (Overseas Affairs hold by the President of the Council of the Indies) | Antonio de Ubilla (Note: As Secretary of the Universal Bureau) | Government Board of the Realms | Philip V |
| 33 | | Juan de Ortega Cano Montañez y Patiño (Archbishop of Mexico) | 4 November 1701 | 27 November 1702 | Vacant (Overseas Affairs hold by the President of the Council of the Indies) | Antonio de Ubilla | Cardinal Portocarrero (Note: During the voyage of Philip V) | Philip V |
| 34 | | Francisco V Fernández de la Cueva Enríquez y Fernández de la Cueva, 10th Duke of Alburquerque and Marquess of Cuéllar | 27 November 1702 | 13 November 1710 | Vacant (Overseas Affairs hold by the President of the Council of the Indies) | Antonio de Ubilla | Cardinal Portocarrero | Philip V |
| 34 | | Francisco V Fernández de la Cueva Enríquez y Fernández de la Cueva, 10th Duke of Alburquerque and Marquess of Cuéllar | 27 November 1702 | 13 November 1710 | Vacant (Overseas Affairs hold by the President of the Council of the Indies) | Antonio de Ubilla | No regency | Philip V |
| 34 | | Francisco V Fernández de la Cueva Enríquez y Fernández de la Cueva, 10th Duke of Alburquerque and Marquess of Cuéllar | 27 November 1702 | 13 November 1710 | Vacant (Overseas Affairs hold by the President of the Council of the Indies) | Marquis of Mejorada del Campo | No regency | Philip V |
| 35 | | Fernando de Alencastre Noroña y Silva, 1st Duke of Linares and Marquess of Valdefuentes | 13 November 1710 | 16 July 1716 | Vacant (Overseas Affairs hold by the President of the Council of the Indies) | Marquis of Mejorada del Campo | No regency | Philip V |
| 35 | | Fernando de Alencastre Noroña y Silva, 1st Duke of Linares and Marquess of Valdefuentes | 13 November 1710 | 16 July 1716 | Vacant (Overseas Affairs hold by the President of the Council of the Indies) | Manuel de Vadillo y Velasco | No regency | Philip V |
| 35 | | Fernando de Alencastre Noroña y Silva, 1st Duke of Linares and Marquess of Valdefuentes | 13 November 1710 | 16 July 1716 | Vacant (Overseas Affairs hold by the President of the Council of the Indies) | José de Grimaldo | No regency | Philip V |
| 35 | | Fernando de Alencastre Noroña y Silva, 1st Duke of Linares and Marquess of Valdefuentes | 13 November 1710 | 16 July 1716 | Bernardo Tinajero de la Escalera (Note: As Secretary of State for the Navy and the Indies of Spain) | José de Grimaldo | No regency | Philip V |
| 35 | | Fernando de Alencastre Noroña y Silva, 1st Duke of Linares and Marquess of Valdefuentes | 13 November 1710 | 16 July 1716 | No secretary | José de Grimaldo | No regency | Philip V |
| 36 | | Baltasar de Zúñiga Guzmán Sotomayor y Mendoza, 1st Duke of Arión and Marquess of Valero | 16 July 1716 | 15 October 1722 | No secretary | José de Grimaldo | No regency | Philip V |
| 36 | | Baltasar de Zúñiga Guzmán Sotomayor y Mendoza, 1st Duke of Arión and Marquess of Valero | 16 July 1716 | 15 October 1722 | Miguel Fernández Durán | José de Grimaldo | No regency | Philip V |
| 36 | | Baltasar de Zúñiga Guzmán Sotomayor y Mendoza, 1st Duke of Arión and Marquess of Valero | 16 July 1716 | 15 October 1722 | Andres Matías de Pes Marzaraga | José de Grimaldo | No regency | Philip V |
| 37 | | Juan de Acuña y Bejarano, 2nd Marquess of Casa Fuerte | 15 October 1722 | 17 March 1734 | Andres Matías de Pes Marzaraga | José de Grimaldo | No regency | Philip V |
| 37 | | Juan de Acuña y Bejarano, 2nd Marquess of Casa Fuerte | 15 October 1722 | 17 March 1734 | No secretary | José de Grimaldo | No regency | Philip V |
| 37 | | Juan de Acuña y Bejarano, 2nd Marquess of Casa Fuerte | 15 October 1722 | 17 March 1734 | Antonio de Sopeña y Mioño | José de Grimaldo | No regency | Philip V |
| 37 | | Juan de Acuña y Bejarano, 2nd Marquess of Casa Fuerte | 15 October 1722 | 17 March 1734 | Antonio de Sopeña y Mioño | Juan Bautista de Orendáin | No regency | Philip V |
| 37 | | Juan de Acuña y Bejarano, 2nd Marquess of Casa Fuerte | 15 October 1722 | 17 March 1734 | Antonio de Sopeña y Mioño | Juan Bautista de Orendáin | No regency | Louis I From 1700 to 1724, Philip V was the king; then from 1724 to 1746. Louis I only reigned in 1724. |
| 37 | | Juan de Acuña y Bejarano, 2nd Marquess of Casa Fuerte | 15 October 1722 | 17 March 1734 | Antonio de Sopeña y Mioño | Juan Bautista de Orendáin | No regency | Philip V |
| 37 | | Juan de Acuña y Bejarano, 2nd Marquess of Casa Fuerte | 15 October 1722 | 17 March 1734 | Antonio de Sopeña y Mioño | José de Grimaldo | No regency | Philip V |
| 37 | | Juan de Acuña y Bejarano, 2nd Marquess of Casa Fuerte | 15 October 1722 | 17 March 1734 | Antonio de Sopeña y Mioño | Baron Ripperda | No regency | Philip V |
| 37 | | Juan de Acuña y Bejarano, 2nd Marquess of Casa Fuerte | 15 October 1722 | 17 March 1734 | Antonio de Sopeña y Mioño | José de Grimaldo | No regency | Philip V |
| 37 | | Juan de Acuña y Bejarano, 2nd Marquess of Casa Fuerte | 15 October 1722 | 17 March 1734 | José de Patiño y Rosales | José de Grimaldo | No regency | Philip V |
| 37 | | Juan de Acuña y Bejarano, 2nd Marquess of Casa Fuerte | 15 October 1722 | 17 March 1734 | José de Patiño y Rosales | Juan Bautista de Orendáin | No regency | Philip V |
| 38 | | Juan Antonio de Vizarrón y Eguiarreta (Archbishop of Mexico) | 17 March 1734 | 17 August 1740 | José de Patiño y Rosales | Juan Bautista de Orendáin | No regency | Philip V |
| 38 | | Juan Antonio de Vizarrón y Eguiarreta (Archbishop of Mexico) | 17 March 1734 | 17 August 1740 | José de Patiño y Rosales | José de Patiño y Rosales (Note: As First Secretary of State) | No regency | Philip V |
| 38 | | Juan Antonio de Vizarrón y Eguiarreta (Archbishop of Mexico) | 17 March 1734 | 17 August 1740 | Mateo Pablo Díaz de Lavandero | Marquess of Villarías | No regency | Philip V |
| 38 | | Juan Antonio de Vizarrón y Eguiarreta (Archbishop of Mexico) | 17 March 1734 | 17 August 1740 | Marquess of Villarías | Marquess of Villarías | No regency | Philip V |
| 39 | | Pedro de Castro Figueroa y Salazar, 1st Duke of La Conquista and 1st Marquess of Gracia Real | 17 August 1740 | 22 August 1741 | Marquess of Villarías | Marquess of Villarías | No regency | Philip V |
| Int. | | Pedro Malo de Villavicencio, President of the Audiencia | 23 August 1741 | 2 November 1742 | Marquess of Villarías | Marquess of Villarías | No regency | Philip V |
| 40 | | Pedro Cebrián y Agustín, 5th Count of Fuenclara | 3 November 1742 | 9 July 1746 | Marquess of Villarías | Marquess of Villarías | No regency | Philip V |
| 40 | | Pedro Cebrián y Agustín, 5th Count of Fuenclara | 3 November 1742 | 9 July 1746 | Marquess of Ensenada | Marquess of Villarías | No regency | Philip V |
| 41 | | Juan Francisco de Güemes y Horcasitas, 1st Count of Revillagigedo | 9 July 1746 | 9 November 1755 | Marquess of Ensenada | Marquess of Villarías | No regency | Ferdinand VI |
| 41 | | Juan Francisco de Güemes y Horcasitas, 1st Count of Revillagigedo | 9 July 1746 | 9 November 1755 | Marquess of Ensenada | José de Carvajal | No regency | Ferdinand VI |
| 41 | | Juan Francisco de Güemes y Horcasitas, 1st Count of Revillagigedo | 9 July 1746 | 9 November 1755 | Marquess of Ensenada | Duke of Huéscar (Interim) | No regency | Ferdinand VI |
| 41 | | Juan Francisco de Güemes y Horcasitas, 1st Count of Revillagigedo | 9 July 1746 | 9 November 1755 | Marquess of Ensenada | Ricardo Wall | No regency | Ferdinand VI |
| 41 | | Juan Francisco de Güemes y Horcasitas, 1st Count of Revillagigedo | 9 July 1746 | 9 November 1755 | Ricardo Wall (Interim) (Note: As Secretary of State for Indies) | Ricardo Wall | No regency | Ferdinand VI |
| 41 | | Juan Francisco de Güemes y Horcasitas, 1st Count of Revillagigedo | 9 July 1746 | 9 November 1755 | Julián de Arriaga y Ribera | Ricardo Wall | No regency | Ferdinand VI |
| 42 | | Agustín de Ahumada y Villalón, Marquess of Amarillas | 10 November 1755 | 5 February 1760 | Julián de Arriaga y Ribera | Ricardo Wall | No regency | Ferdinand VI |
| 42 | | Agustín de Ahumada y Villalón, Marquess of Amarillas | 10 November 1755 | 5 February 1760 | Julián de Arriaga y Ribera | Ricardo Wall | Elisabeth Farnese (Note: Until the arrival of Charles III) | Charles III |
| 42 | | Agustín de Ahumada y Villalón, Marquess of Amarillas | 10 November 1755 | 5 February 1760 | Julián de Arriaga y Ribera | Ricardo Wall | No regency | Charles III |
| Int. | | Francisco Antonio de Echávarri, Dean of the Audiencia | 5 February 1760 | 28 April 1760 | Julián de Arriaga y Ribera | Ricardo Wall | No regency | Charles III |
| 43 | | Francisco Cajigal de la Vega | 28 April 1760 | 5 October 1760 | Julián de Arriaga y Ribera | Ricardo Wall | No regency | Charles III |
| 44 | | Joaquín de Montserrat, Marquess of Cruillas | 5 October 1760 | 24 August 1766 | Julián de Arriaga y Ribera | Ricardo Wall | No regency | Charles III |
| 44 | | Joaquín de Montserrat, Marquess of Cruillas | 5 October 1760 | 24 August 1766 | Julián de Arriaga y Ribera | Jerónimo Grimaldi | No regency | Charles III |
| 45 | | Carlos Francisco de Croix, Marquess of Croix | 24 August 1766 | 22 September 1771 | Julián de Arriaga y Ribera | Jerónimo Grimaldi | No regency | Charles III |
| 46 | | Antonio María de Bucareli y Ursúa | 22 September 1771 | 9 April 1779 | Julián de Arriaga y Ribera | Jerónimo Grimaldi | No regency | Charles III |
| 46 | | Antonio María de Bucareli y Ursúa | 22 September 1771 | 9 April 1779 | Marquess of Sonora | Jerónimo Grimaldi | No regency | Charles III |
| 46 | | Antonio María de Bucareli y Ursúa | 22 September 1771 | 9 April 1779 | Marquess of Sonora | Count of Floridablanca | No regency | Charles III |
| Int. | | Francisco Romá y Rosell, Regent of the Audiencia | 10 April 1779 | 22 August 1779 | Marquess of Sonora | Count of Floridablanca | No regency | Charles III |
| 47 | | Martín de Mayorga Ferrer, Captain General of Guatemala | 23 August 1779 | 28 April 1783 | Marquess of Sonora | Count of Floridablanca | No regency | Charles III |
| 48 | | Matías de Gálvez y Gallardo, Captain General of Guatemala | 28 April 1783 | 20 October 1784 | Marquess of Sonora | Count of Floridablanca | No regency | Charles III |
| – | | Vicente de Herrera y Rivero, Regent of the Audiencia | 20 October 1784 | 17 June 1785 | Marquess of Sonora | Count of Floridablanca | No regency | Charles III |
| 49 | | Bernardo de Gálvez y Madrid, 1st Viscount of Galveston and 1st Count of Gálvez | 17 June 1785 | 30 November 1786 | Marquess of Sonora | Count of Floridablanca | No regency | Charles III |
| Int. | | Eusebio Sánchez Pareja y Beleño; Regent of the Audiencia | 30 November 1786 | 8 May 1787 | Marquess of Sonora | Count of Floridablanca | No regency | Charles III |
| 50 | | Alonso Núñez de Haro y Peralta (Archbishop of Mexico) | 8 May 1787 | 16 August 1787 | Marquess of Sonora | Count of Floridablanca | No regency | Charles III |
| 50 | | Alonso Núñez de Haro y Peralta (Archbishop of Mexico) | 8 May 1787 | 16 August 1787 | Count of Floridablanca (Interim) | Count of Floridablanca | No regency | Charles III |
| 50 | | Alonso Núñez de Haro y Peralta (Archbishop of Mexico) | 8 May 1787 | 16 August 1787 | Antonio Porlier (Note: As Secretary of State for Grace and Justice of Indies) Antonio Valdés y Fernández Bazán (Note: As Secretary of State for War, Treasury, Commerce and Navigation of Indies) | Count of Floridablanca | No regency | Charles III |
| 51 | | Manuel Antonio Flórez Maldonado | 16 August 1787 | 16 October 1789 | Antonio Porlier Antonio Valdés y Fernández Bazán | Count of Floridablanca | No regency | Charles III |
| 52 | | Juan Vicente de Güemes Pacheco de Padilla y Horcasitas, 2nd Count of Revillagigedo | 17 October 1789 | 11 July 1794 | Antonio Porlier Antonio Valdés y Fernández Bazán | Count of Floridablanca | No regency | Charles III |
| 52 | | Juan Vicente de Güemes Pacheco de Padilla y Horcasitas, 2nd Count of Revillagigedo | 17 October 1789 | 11 July 1794 | Antonio Porlier Antonio Valdés y Fernández Bazán | Count of Floridablanca | No regency | Charles IV |
| 52 | | Juan Vicente de Güemes Pacheco de Padilla y Horcasitas, 2nd Count of Revillagigedo | 17 October 1789 | 11 July 1794 | No secretary (affairs of Indies distributed among different secretariats) | Count of Aranda (Interim) | No regency | Charles IV |
| 52 | | Juan Vicente de Güemes Pacheco de Padilla y Horcasitas, 2nd Count of Revillagigedo | 17 October 1789 | 11 July 1794 | No secretary (affairs of Indies distributed among different secretariats) | Manuel Godoy | No regency | Charles IV |
| 53 | | Miguel de la Grúa Talamanca de Carini y Branciforte, 1st Marquess of Branciforte | 12 July 1794 | 31 May 1798 | No secretary (affairs of Indies distributed among different secretariats) | Manuel Godoy | No regency | Charles IV |
| 53 | | Miguel de la Grúa Talamanca de Carini y Branciforte, 1st Marquess of Branciforte | 12 July 1794 | 31 May 1798 | No secretary (affairs of Indies distributed among different secretariats) | Francisco de Saavedra | No regency | Charles IV |
| 54 | | Miguel José de Azanza Alegría, 1st Duke of Santa Fe | 31 May 1798 | 30 April 1800 | No secretary (affairs of Indies distributed among different secretariats) | Francisco de Saavedra | No regency | Charles IV |
| 54 | | Miguel José de Azanza Alegría, 1st Duke of Santa Fe | 31 May 1798 | 30 April 1800 | No secretary (affairs of Indies distributed among different secretariats) | Mariano Luis de Urquijo | No regency | Charles IV |
| 55 | | Félix Berenguer de Marquina | 30 April 1800 | 4 January 1803 | No secretary (affairs of Indies distributed among different secretariats) | Mariano Luis de Urquijo | No regency | Charles IV |
| 55 | | Félix Berenguer de Marquina | 30 April 1800 | 4 January 1803 | No secretary (affairs of Indies distributed among different secretariats) | Pedro Cevallos Guerra | No regency | Charles IV |
| 56 | | José de Iturrigaray (Note: Loyal to Ferdinand VII during the Spanish War of Independence) | 4 January 1803 | 16 September 1808 | No secretary (affairs of Indies distributed among different secretariats) | Pedro Cevallos Guerra | No regency | Charles IV |
| 56 | | José de Iturrigaray | 4 January 1803 | 16 September 1808 | No secretary (affairs of Indies distributed among different secretariats) | Gonzalo O'Farril | No regency | Charles IV |
| 56 | | José de Iturrigaray | 4 January 1803 | 16 September 1808 | No secretary (affairs of Indies distributed among different secretariats) | Pedro Cevallos Guerra | No regency | Ferdinand VII |
| 56 | | José de Iturrigaray | 4 January 1803 | 16 September 1808 | Miguel José de Azanza (Note: As Minister of the Indies of Spain) | Mariano Luis de Urquijo | No regency | Joseph I (Note: The viceroys didn't recognise Joseph Bonaparte, they were loyal to Ferdinand VII) |
| 57 | | Pedro de Garibay | 16 September 1808 | 19 July 1809 | Miguel José de Azanza | Mariano Luis de Urquijo | No regency | Joseph I |
| 58 | | Francisco Javier de Lizana y Beaumont (Archbishop of Mexico) | 19 July 1809 | 8 May 1810 | Miguel José de Azanza | Mariano Luis de Urquijo | No regency | Joseph I |
| 59 | | Pedro Catani | 8 May 1810 | 14 September 1810 | Miguel José de Azanza | Mariano Luis de Urquijo | No regency | Joseph I |
| 60 | | Francisco Javier Venegas, 1st Marquess of Reunión and of New Spain | 14 September 1810 | 4 March 1813 | Miguel José de Azanza | Mariano Luis de Urquijo | No regency | Joseph I |
| 61 | | Félix María Calleja del Rey, 1st Count of Calderón | 4 March 1813 | 20 September 1816 | Miguel José de Azanza | Mariano Luis de Urquijo | No regency | Joseph I |
| 61 | | Félix María Calleja del Rey, 1st Count of Calderón | 4 March 1813 | 20 September 1816 | No secretary | Juan O'Donoju (Interim) | No regency | Joseph I |
| 61 | | Félix María Calleja del Rey, 1st Count of Calderón | 4 March 1813 | 20 September 1816 | No secretary | Fernando de Laserna (Interim) | No regency | Joseph I |
| 61 | | Félix María Calleja del Rey, 1st Count of Calderón | 4 March 1813 | 20 September 1816 | Manuel Antonio de la Bodega y Mollinedo (Note: As Secretary of State for Overseas Governance of Spain) | José Luyando (Interim) | No regency | Ferdinand VII |
| 61 | | Félix María Calleja del Rey, 1st Count of Calderón | 4 March 1813 | 20 September 1816 | Miguel de Lardizabal | José Miguel de Carvajal-Vargas | No regency | Ferdinand VII |
| 61 | | Félix María Calleja del Rey, 1st Count of Calderón | 4 March 1813 | 20 September 1816 | Miguel de Lardizabal | Pedro Cevallos Guerra | No regency | Ferdinand VII |
| 61 | | Félix María Calleja del Rey, 1st Count of Calderón | 4 March 1813 | 20 September 1816 | No secretary | Jaun Estebán Lozano de Torres | No regency | Ferdinand VII |
| 61 | | Félix María Calleja del Rey, 1st Count of Calderón | 4 March 1813 | 20 September 1816 | No secretary | Pedro Cevallos Guerra | No regency | Ferdinand VII |
| 62 | | Juan Ruiz de Apodaca, 1st Count of Venadito | 20 September 1816 | 5 July 1821 | No secretary | Pedro Cevallos Guerra | No regency | Ferdinand VII |
| 62 | | Juan Ruiz de Apodaca, 1st Count of Venadito | 20 September 1816 | 5 July 1821 | No secretary | José García de León | No regency | Ferdinand VII |
| 62 | | Juan Ruiz de Apodaca, 1st Count of Venadito | 20 September 1816 | 5 July 1821 | No secretary | Carlos Martínez de Irujo (Interim) | No regency | Ferdinand VII |
| 62 | | Juan Ruiz de Apodaca, 1st Count of Venadito | 20 September 1816 | 5 July 1821 | No secretary | Manuel González Salmón (Interim) | No regency | Ferdinand VII |
| 62 | | Juan Ruiz de Apodaca, 1st Count of Venadito | 20 September 1816 | 5 July 1821 | No secretary | Joaquín José Melgarejo | No regency | Ferdinand VII |
| 62 | | Juan Ruiz de Apodaca, 1st Count of Venadito | 20 September 1816 | 5 July 1821 | Antonio González Salmón (Interim) | Joaquín José Melgarejo | No regency | Ferdinand VII |
| 62 | | Juan Ruiz de Apodaca, 1st Count of Venadito | 20 September 1816 | 5 July 1821 | Antonio González Salmón (Interim) | Juan Jabat Aztal | No regency | Ferdinand VII |
| 62 | | Juan Ruiz de Apodaca, 1st Count of Venadito | 20 September 1816 | 5 July 1821 | Antonio Porcel Román | Juan Jabat Aztal | No regency | Ferdinand VII |
| 62 | | Juan Ruiz de Apodaca, 1st Count of Venadito | 20 September 1816 | 5 July 1821 | Antonio Porcel Román | Evaristo Pérez de Castro | No regency | Ferdinand VII |
| 62 | | Juan Ruiz de Apodaca, 1st Count of Venadito | 20 September 1816 | 5 July 1821 | Ramón Gil de la Cuadra | Evaristo Pérez de Castro | No regency | Ferdinand VII |
| 62 | | Juan Ruiz de Apodaca, 1st Count of Venadito | 20 September 1816 | 5 July 1821 | Antonio de Guilleman (Interim) | Joaquín Anduaga Cuenca (Interim) | No regency | Ferdinand VII |
| 62 | | Juan Ruiz de Apodaca, 1st Count of Venadito | 20 September 1816 | 5 July 1821 | Antonio de Guilleman (Interim) | Francisco de Paula Escudero (Interim) | No regency | Ferdinand VII |
| 62 | | Juan Ruiz de Apodaca, 1st Count of Venadito | 20 September 1816 | 5 July 1821 | Ramón Olaguer Feliú | Francisco de Paula Escudero (Interim) | No regency | Ferdinand VII |
| 62 | | Juan Ruiz de Apodaca, 1st Count of Venadito | 20 September 1816 | 5 July 1821 | Ramón Olaguer Feliú | Eusebio Bardají y Azara | No regency | Ferdinand VII |
| 62 | | Juan Ruiz de Apodaca, 1st Count of Venadito | 20 September 1816 | 5 July 1821 | Ramón López Pelegrín | Eusebio Bardají y Azara | No regency | Ferdinand VII |
| 63 | | Francisco Novella Azabal Pérez y Sicardo | 15 July 1821 | 21 July 1821 | Ramón López Pelegrín | Eusebio Bardají y Azara | No regency | Ferdinand VII |
| 64 | | Juan O'Donojú | 21 July 1821 | 28 September 1821 | Ramón López Pelegrín | Eusebio Bardají y Azara | No regency | Ferdinand VII |

== See also ==
- Mexico
- History of Mexico
- List of heads of state of Mexico
- Spanish attempts to reconquer Mexico
- Viceroyalty of New Spain
  - Governor-General of the Philippines
- Viceroyalty of Peru
- Viceroyalty of the Río de la Plata
- Viceroyalty of New Granada
