= Luis de Velasco, 2nd Viceroy of New Spain =

Mexican politician

Luis de Velasco
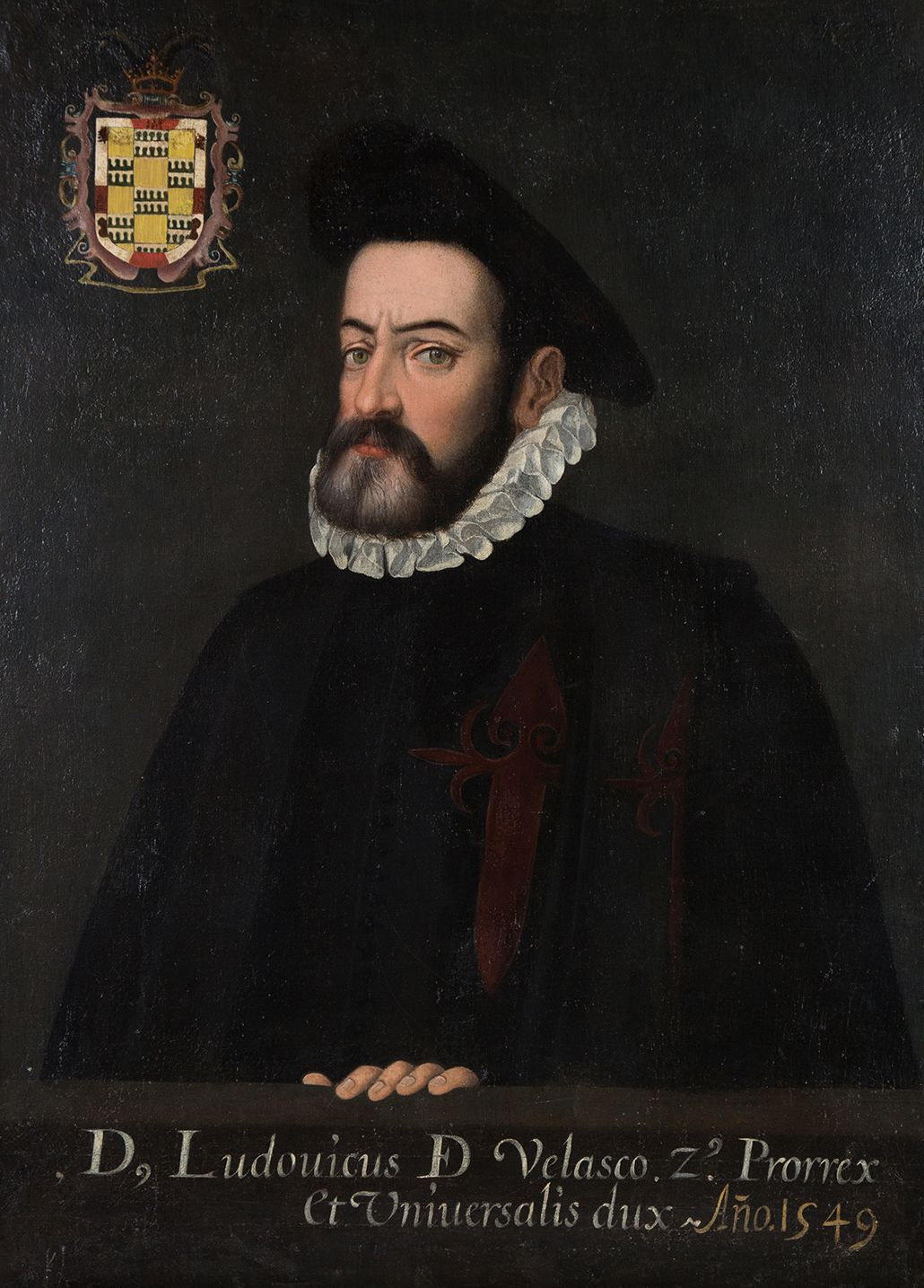

2nd Viceroy of New Spain
- In office November 25, 1550 – July 31, 1564
- Monarch: Charles I of Spain
- Preceded by: Antonio de Mendoza
- Succeeded by: Francisco Ceinos

Personal details
- Born: Luís de Velasco y Ruiz de Alarcón c. 1511 Carrión de los Condes, Palencia, Spain
- Died: July 31, 1564 (aged 52–53) Mexico City, Viceroyalty of New Spain

Luis de Velasco y Ruiz de Alarcón (1511 – July 31, 1564) was the second viceroy of New Spain during the Spanish colonization of the Americas in the mid-sixteenth century.

== Biography ==
Velasco was born in the town of Carrión de los Condes, in the province of Palencia, in 1511. The son of a wealthy nobleman, Velasco received formal education at a young age. By 1547, he had become viceroy and leader of Spain's armed forces in the Kingdom of Navarre.

Impressed with Velasco's achievements and loyalty to the Spanish crown, Emperor Charles V (King Charles I of Spain) sent him to New Spain, in 1550, to deal with problems in the Spanish colonies, among them slavery and the encomienda system. He was accompanied by his son, Luis de Velasco, marqués de Salinas, himself a future viceroy of New Spain. Velasco replaced the previous viceroy, Antonio de Mendoza.

Mendoza had been given his choice of the Viceroyalty of Mexico or of Peru, with Velasco to fill the other office. Velasco arrived at San Juan de Ulúa, New Spain on August 23, 1550. He spent the month of September in Puebla, while Mendoza was making his choice. Finally the two men decided to meet in Cholula, and there Mendoza chose Peru. On November 25, 1550, Velasco made his official entry into Mexico City, thus becoming Viceroy of New Spain. He served until his death there on July 31, 1564.

Velasco helped the natives defend themselves against the abuses of gold-mining slave owners, and released 15,000 Indian slaves. On January 25, 1553, Velasco inaugurated the Royal and Pontifical University of Mexico. He commissioned the founding of the towns of San Miguel el Grande (now San Miguel de Allende), Durango (1563), San Felipe de Ixtlahuaca, and Nombre de Dios. He also instituted public services such as hospitals and law enforcement for the natives.

In 1558, Mexico experienced its first large flood of the Spanish era, and afterwards an epidemic. The Viceroy did everything in his power to aid the many victims.

Up to 1560, Velasco governed with unlimited authority. Although he had committed no abuses, in that year the Audiencia and other powerful Spaniards attempted to influence the emperor to limit the authority of the Viceroy by requiring prior authorization of his actions by the Audiencia.

In his final years, Velasco focused his efforts on establishing settlements in Florida, exploring the Pacific Ocean and searching for more riches for the Empire. In 1559, Velasco sent a fleet of 13 ships under the command of Tristán de Luna y Arellano to establish settlements on the eastern coast of Florida. The expedition failed when the settlements were struck by hunger and quarrels with hostile native warriors. The Spaniards were forced to abandon them.

In early 1564, Velasco commissioned Miguel López de Legazpi and Andrés de Urdaneta to lead an expedition across the Pacific to the Spice Islands, where Ferdinand Magellan and Ruy López de Villalobos had landed in 1521 and 1543. Velasco died in 1564. At his death, it was found that instead of enriching himself in office, he had gone into debt out of his concern for the poor and the Indians. He was succeeded by Francisco Ceinos as interim viceroy in 1564, and by Gastón de Peralta, marqués de Falces as permanent viceroy in 1566.
