= Alonso Muñoz =

Spanish colonial administrator

Alonso Muñoz (sometimes Alonso de Muñoz y Muso) (ca. 1512, Caravaca de la Cruz, Murcia, Caravaca, Spain – December 19, 1568) was a high-ranking administrator in Spain and, from November 1567 to about July 1568, royal commissioner with Luis Carrillo for the inspection of the government of New Spain for King Philip II.

== Origins and early career ==
A descendant of successful rancher Parents Pedro de Muñoz and Catalina Muso Lopez, involved in the production and sale of wool, Muñoz studied to become a lawyer. He was oidor (judge) in the Audiencia de Grados in Seville. In 1553 in Seville he married Catalina de Otálora they had a son Sancho Muñoz De Otalora. His wife Catalina de Otárola y Ximenez de Bohorquez was the daughter of Licenciado Sancho López de Otálora, a member of the Royal Council. At the time, Seville was one of the most important cities in Spain, being a major port for trade with the Indies.

On March 22, 1559, Muñoz was named oidor in the Chancellery of Valladolid. He took office on April 20 and remained there for three years.

== In the Council of the Indies ==
On September 19, 1562 he was named a member of the Council of the Indies in Madrid. The Council was the powerful overseer of Spain's colonial empire, being responsible for government, administration, justice, taxes, war and religion. It had the responsibility to nominate for the king's consideration, individuals for the highest offices in the colonial government. It directed the colonial administrations, and could propose new laws and abrogate old ones, under the king's authority.

In 1564 the Council of the Indies took steps to protect shipping between New Spain and Spain, which was under attack from pirates and from Spain's colonial rivals. Warships were assigned to protect merchant ships on the route. This increased the travel time, typically to two or three months, when a fast ship, unescorted, could make the trip in three weeks.

In 1565, while Muñoz was still serving on the Council of the Indies, the Second Marqués del Valle de Oaxaca and Luis Cortés, both sons of Hernán Cortés, led a conspiracy to declare the independence of New Spain. The conspiracy was suppressed and some of the conspirators, including the sons of Cortés, were arrested. Before the arrival of the new viceroy, Gastón de Peralta, marqués de Falces, the Audiencia had had two conspirators executed, and had sentenced Martín and Luis to death. Upon his arrival, Peralta reviewed the cases and suspended the death sentences given the sons of Cortés. They were sent back to Spain to be dealt with by the Council of the Indies. The Audiencia denounced the new viceroy for his friendship with the rebels.

== As royal commissioner in New Spain ==
Conflicting reports sent back to Spain led to confusion in the Council of the Indies. The Council proposed to the king that he send a special commission to the colony to investigate the situation and bring actions against guilty parties, up to and including the removal of the viceroy. By a royal edict dated June 16, 1567, Philip II named a commission consisting of Licenciado Gaspar de Jarava, Licenciado Alonso Muñoz and Doctor Luis Carrillo. The first two were from the Council of the Indies; Doctor Carrillo was an official in the Court.

Philip gave written instructions to the commissioners. They were to order Viceroy Peralta to return to Spain at the first opportunity. The government of the colony was to be turned over to Licenciado Jarava, the oldest of the three commissioners, and in his absence, to Licenciado Muñoz. Sentences of death were not to be given without the unanimous approval of the commissioners.

Commissioner Jarava died on the voyage, on July 18, 1567, one day after reaching Grand Canary. Muñoz and Carrillo arrived in Veracruz on October 29, 1567. They began their work in Mexico City early in November. By this time the Audiencia had already freed Martín Cortés on condition that he leave Mexico. The first decision of the commission was to construct a jail, "in the manner of those of the Santo Officio [Inquisition]", to imprison the principal accused, including Baltasar de Aguilar Cervantes and Luis Cortés.

Aguilar was the principal accuser of Martín Cortes, Marquess del Valle, but upon recognizing Viceroy Peralta's sympathy with the marquess, Aguilar had withdrawn his accusations. He was arrested now and subjected to torture to determine which of his accounts was the true one. Under torture he admitted that the second version, favorable to Cortés, was meant to persuade the viceroy. He was condemned to ten years in the galleys, forfeiture of his property, and perpetual exile from the Indies. Also tried were the brothers Pedro and Baltazar de Quesada.

== Return to Spain ==
Doctor Carrillo left to return to Spain, accompanied by some of the prisoners being transferred there. Muñoz remained in Mexico City in accordance with his instructions from the king, to continue as interim governor of the colony until the arrival of a new viceroy. Before Carrillo embarked from the port of Veracruz, however, a ship arrived carrying instructions ordering both commissioners to return to Spain and leaving the government in charge of the Audiencia. Muñoz, who was not anxious to leave, nevertheless went to Veracruz and embarked with Carrillo, ex-Viceroy Peralta, and the prisoners.

Carrillo died on the voyage from Veracruz to Havana. The Audiencia of Mexico City under its president Francisco Ceinos continued to govern there until November. In that month the new viceroy, Martín Enríquez de Almanza, arrived and took over the administration.

Muñoz gave the formal report of his mission to the king in late August 1568. He died on December 19, 1568.

Muñoz has been accused of dealing too harshly with the conspirators, and indeed King Philip II was said to be displeased with his severity. However, according to Schäfer, his cruelty was enormously exaggerated. Besides the two brothers Cortés, who were sent to Spain, only 64 people were tried. Eight of these were condemned to death (but only seven were executed), and nine were acquitted. The majority of the others were sentenced only to exile or monetary fines.

== See also ==
- List of Viceroys of New Spain
- Fireball Cinnamon Whisky
