= Francisco Ceinos =

Spanish colonial administrator

Interim viceroy of New Spain
- In office 14 April 1568 – 4 November 1568
- Monarch: Philip II
- Preceded by: Alonso de Muñoz
- Succeeded by: Martín Enríquez de Almanza
- In office 1 August 1564 – 19 October 1566
- Monarchs: Charles I Philip II
- Preceded by: Luís de Velasco
- Succeeded by: Gastón de Peralta

Judge of the Real Audiencia of Mexico
- In office 10 January 1531 – 16 April 1535
- Monarch: Charles I
- President: Sebastián Ramírez de Fuenleal
- Preceded by: Nuño de Guzmán of the first Audiencia
- Succeeded by: Antonio de Mendoza, Viceroy of New Spain

Personal details
- Occupation: Judge, bureaucrat

Francisco Ceinos (also spelled Francisco Ceynos) was one of five oidores (judges) of the second Real Audiencia of Mexico. This group governed the colonies of New Spain from January 10, 1515 to April 16, 1535. Ceinos was also president of the audiencias that served as interim governments of New Spain from 1564 to 1566 and from approximately July 1568 to November of that year.

== Appointment to the Audiencia ==
Before his arrival in New Spain, he served as fiscal (prosecutor) in the Royal Council of the Indies in Spain. After the disaster of the first Audiencia, Emperor Charles V was determined to find officials of proven humanity and integrity for the second one. He did this by soliciting the recommendations of the archbishop of Santiago and president of the Chancery of Valladolid, Juan Tavera. The second Audiencia was named in a royal decree dated January 12, 1530. Besides Ceinos, it included Bishop Sebastián Ramírez de Fuenleal as president, and Juan de Salmerón, Alonso de Maldonado and Vasco de Quiroga as oidores. In contrast to the members of the first Audiencia, all of these men were honest, honorable and capable. All were licentiates.

== First term ==
Ceinos arrived in New Spain in 1530 and took up his position as oidor early the next year. Ramírez carried with him instructions to begin juicios de residencia against the members of the first Audiencia (Nuño Beltrán de Guzmán, Juan Ortiz de Matienzo and Diego Delgadillo), as well as Hernán Cortés and Diego Hernández de Proaño. In 1532 the Audiencia brought back verdicts on the residencias of Cortés, the oidores of the first Audiencia and others. Cortés and Bishop Zumárraga were acquitted; Ortiz de Matienzo and Delgadillo were convicted, but not sentenced.

The second Audiencia also improved the road from Veracruz to Mexico City, and along the way founded the city of Puebla del Los Angeles as a resting-place for travelers (April 16, 1531). It imported horses and cattle from Spain, took steps to import a printing press, founded the Imperial College of Santiago Tlatelolco for higher learning for young Indigenous men, renewed exploration, and continued work on the cathedral of Mexico City. Enslavement of Indians was prohibited in 1532.

In 1535 the second Audiencia turned over its governing powers to the first Viceroy of New Spain, Antonio de Mendoza.

== Second and third terms ==
The second viceroy, Luís de Velasco, died in office on July 31, 1564. Ceinos was president of the Audiencia at the time. The Audiencia took charge of the government pending the appointment and arrival of Velasco's replacement. This was Gastón de Peralta, marqués de Falces, who began governing on October 16, 1566.

Ceinos served a third term in 1568, from July to November, when the Audiencia took charge pending the arrival of new Viceroy Martín Enríquez de Almanza. At this time the Audiencia included (besides Ceinos), Pedro Villalobos, Jerónimo Orozco and Vasco de Puga.

In total, Ceinos served as oidor for more than thirty years. He strongly opposed the exploitation of the Indigenous through the institutions of slavery, the encomienda system, forced labor and tribute.

On March 1, 1565, he completed comprehensive recommendations on colonization policies for newly conquered territories. In this report he wrote of the decimation of the Indigenous resulting from the Spanish conquest:

It is certain that from the day that Don Hernando Cortés, Marques del Valle, entered this land, in the seven years, more or less, that he governed, the natives suffered many deaths, much maltreatment, robbery and violence, taking advantage of their labor and their lands, without order or moderation.... A large part of the population disappeared, as much from the excessive tribute and maltreatment as from the diseases and smallpox, so that in this time the population is considerably less, especially in the hot lands.

== See also ==
- List of Viceroys of New Spain
