= Gastón de Peralta, 3rd Marquess of Falces =

Mexican politician

Gastón de Peralta
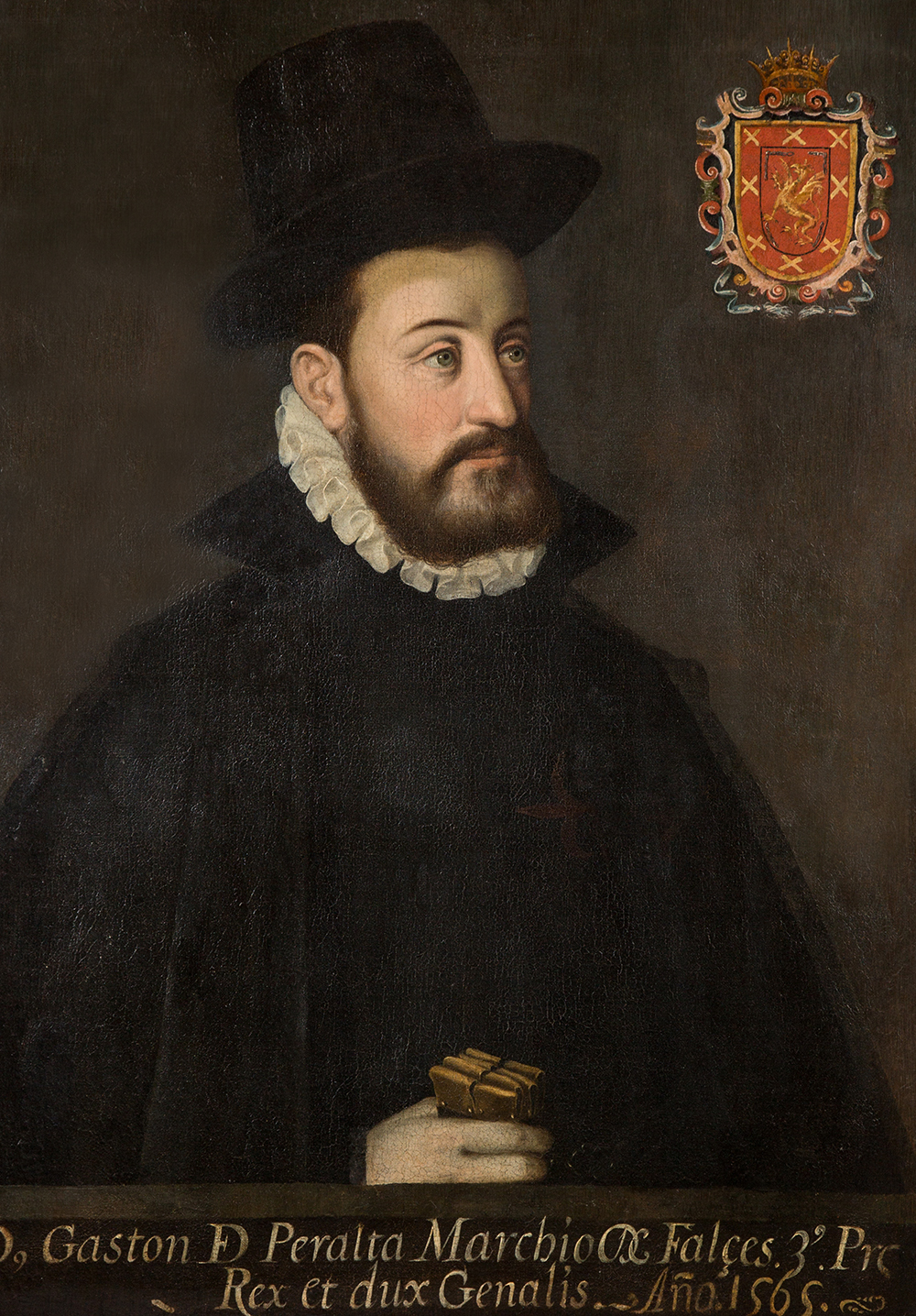

3rd Viceroy of New Spain
- In office 19 October 1566 – 11 November 1567
- Monarch: Philip II
- Preceded by: Francisco Ceinos
- Succeeded by: Alonso de Muñoz and Luis Carrillo

Personal details
- Born: 1510 Pau, Kingdom of Navarre
- Died: 1587 (aged 76–77) Valladolid, Spain

Gastón Carrillo de Peralta y Bosquete, 3rd Marquess of Falces (Spanish: Don Gastón Carrillo de Peralta, III marqués de Falces) (1510–1587) was a Spanish nobleman who was the third viceroy of the Viceroyalty of New Spain (colonial México) from October 16, 1566 to March 10, 1568.

== Biography ==
He was born in Pau, Navarre (now part of France), the son of Antonio de Peralta y Velasco (c. 1490–1545), 2nd Marquess of Falces and Count of Santesteban, and the grandson of Alonso Carrillo de Peralta y Acuña, 1st Marquess of Falces.

Gastón de Peralta was appointed viceroy of New Spain in 1566, replacing Francisco Ceinos and the Audiencia Real of Mexico, which had been governing on an interim basis since the death of the previous viceroy, Luís de Velasco.

After the death of Velasco, a conspiracy to obtain independence from Spain was discovered. Some personalities of high position, including some close relatives of Hernán Cortés — Martín, Don Martín Cortés y de Zuñiga, and Luís (his sons, and half-brothers of each other) — were involved in this plot. It was made known to Peralta while he was still at the coast in Veracruz, before he entered Mexico City to take up his office officially. A local judge of the Audiencia Real of México had sentenced the conspirators to death, but Peralta personally reviewed the cases of each of the prisoners and suspended the death penalty for Luís and Martín Cortés. They were sent back to Spain to be dealt with by the Council of the Indies.

Peralta arrived in Mexico City in a tense atmosphere. One of his first acts was to remove the artillery and soldiers that had been posted at the viceroy's palace and in the principal streets of the city. His leniency toward the conspirators alarmed the Audiencia, which accused him of sympathizing with the rebels and protecting them. Testimony was given that the new viceroy had a list of 30,000 rebel fighters ready to rise against the Crown. These accusations were communicated to Spanish king Philip II in a letter. Alarmed, King Philip dispatched two visitadores, Luis Carrillo and Lic. Alonso Muñoz, to New Spain to investigate the charges. They ordered Peralta back to Spain to explain his conduct.

In his brief term of office, Peralta founded a hospital for the aged, invalids, convalescents, and the "insane."

Back in Spain, he was tried and acquitted. Subsequently, he was made constable of Navarre. He died in Valladolid in 1587.

== See also ==
- Francisco Ceinos
