= Martín Enríquez de Almanza =

Fourth viceroy of New Spain (r. 1568–1580)

The Most Excellent Martín Enríquez de Almanza
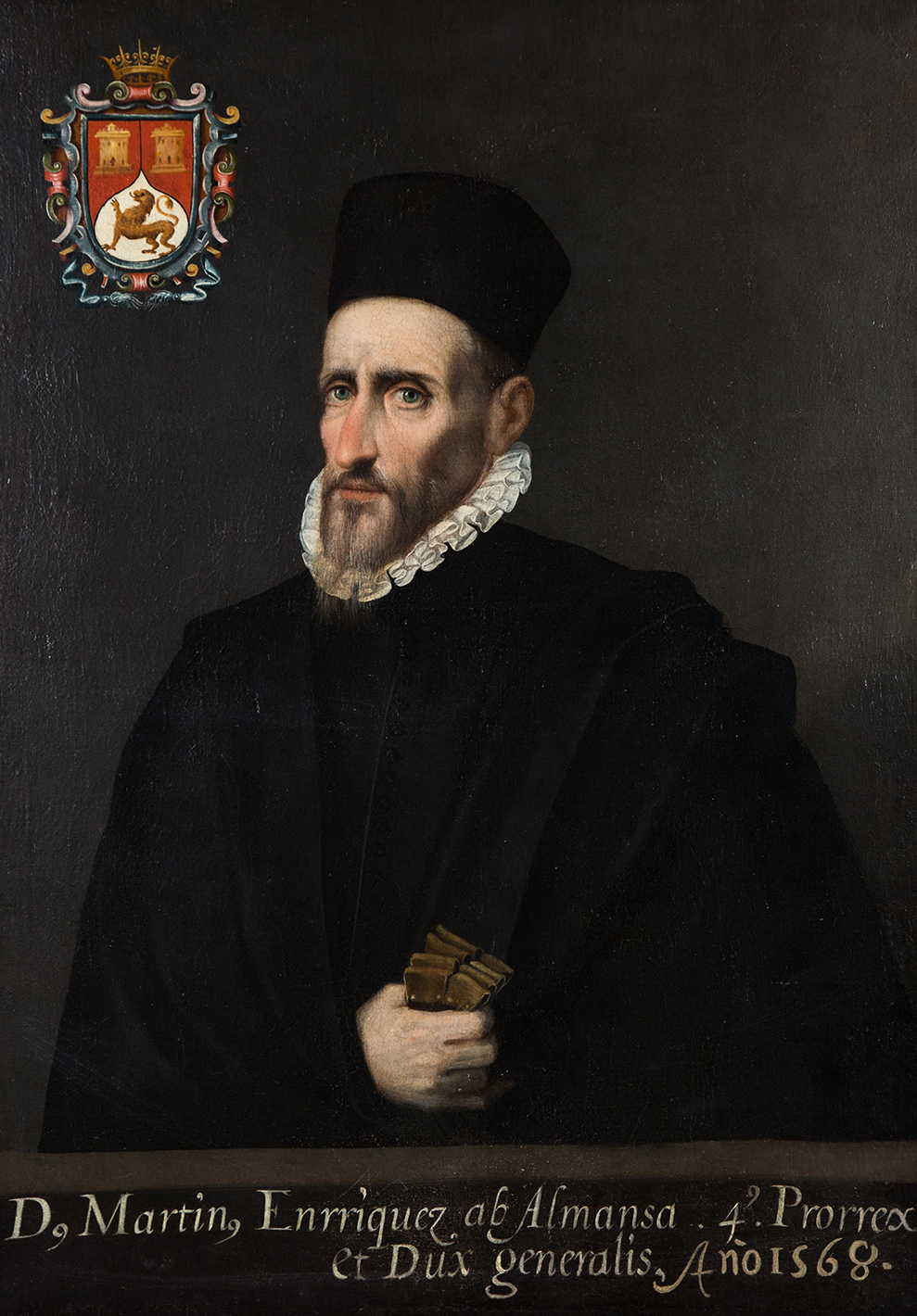

4th Viceroy of New Spain
- In office November 5, 1568 – October 3, 1580
- Monarch: Philip II
- Preceded by: Gastón de Peralta, 3rd Marquess of Falces
- Succeeded by: Lorenzo Suárez de Mendoza, 4th Count of La Coruña

6th Viceroy of Peru
- In office September 23, 1581 – March 13, 1583
- Monarch: Charles I of Spain
- Preceded by: Francisco de Toledo
- Succeeded by: Fernando Torres de Portugal y Mesía

Personal details
- Born: Martín Enríquez de Almanza y Ulloa Toro, Zamora Spain
- Died: March 13, 1583 Lima, Viceroyalty of Peru

Martín Enríquez de Almanza y Ulloa (died ca. March 13, 1583) was the fourth viceroy of New Spain, who ruled in the name of Philip II from November 5, 1568 until October 3, 1580.

Like many of the early viceroys of New Spain, Almanza was of royal heritage. He was a member of the House of Enríquez, one of the four cadet branches of the House of Burgundy, the ruling dynasty in Castile, yet never inherited a title.

Enríquez was 60 when he was appointed viceroy in New Spain. He brought strength and stability in the wake of the encomenderos' conspiracy of the son of conqueror Hernán Cortés, Don Martín Cortés and other encomenderos who challenged the crown's power. He was subsequently viceroy of Peru, from September 23, 1581 until his death in 1583, a post he reluctantly accepted at age 72. He was a very able administrator in Mexico, asserting crown control, and effective in establishing defenses against northern natives who threatened the vital link between the silver mines in north and Mexico's center.

== Early years ==
Born Martín Enríquez de Almanza y Ulloa, his father was Francisco Enríquez de Almanza, 1st Marquess of Alcañices, great-great-grandchild of Infante Fadrique Alfonso of Castile, an illegitimate child of Alfonso XI of Castile. His mother was Isabel de Ulloa y Castilla, also a Castilian royal on her mother's side.

== Government and actions ==
Having been chosen by the Council of the Indies (Consejo de Indias) as viceroy, his first actions upon arrival in New Spain, at Veracruz, were to dislodge the English pirates from the Isla de Sacrificios, a base they had been using to raid the coast and Spanish shipping. When he arrived in Mexico City, he immediately took steps to end the turmoil left by the former president of the Real Audiencia, Alonso Muñoz.

Arms of Martín Enríquez de Almanza, which derive from the Spanish Royal Family

Enríquez de Almanza also acted as a mediator between the bishops and the religious orders operating in New Spain. The dispute between these two religious groups dated from the viceroyalty of Gastón de Peralta, 3rd Marquis of Falces, when a royal disposition stipulated that the administration of the parishes was the responsibility of the secular clergy, obliging friars, nuns and members of the regular clergy to retreat to convents. The regular clergy refused to obey this disposition, beginning the conflict. The Franciscans threatened to abandon the city, and in fact began a march to Veracruz. They were threatened by Indians and ordered to return by the viceroy. After receiving some concessions, they returned to Mexico City. As Viceroy, one of the most pressing issues was the Chichimeca War, which had brought Spanish silver mining in the North to almost a standstill. In 1570 the viceroy personally led an expedition against the Indian tribes that had been devastating the interior, but he did not give into demand for total war against the Chichimeca. According to one historian,

Viceroy Enriquez did not handle the administration of frontier warfare with brilliance, but neither could it be said that he had been unduly lax in this important task. Like so many other phases of his viceregency, the frontier administration of Enriquez could be classified as mediocre, but respectably so by comparison with the weak and uncoordinated measures which preceded his arrival in New Spain. The Spanish war against the Chichimecas in the 1570's was greatly handicapped by royal failure to allot sufficient funds as well as by the character and habitat of the foe they faced. For these things the viceroy himself could hardly be held responsible. Enrifquez apparently did what he could with the money and the powers granted him, and conducted the war like the loyal servant of the king that he was.

He established presidios at Ojuelos and Portezuelos, on the road to Zacatecas. He founded the Villa de San Felipe (Guanajuato) and many other towns and villages, as well as colleges and convents. In 1573 he began the construction of the Cathedral of Mexico City.

Enríquez brought medical attention to the unprotected and helped those in critical conditions. He established hospitals in the city to treat the victims of a terrible epidemic (thought to be chicken pox or varicella) that left 3,000 people dead. He published regulations in which the social protection of the Indians was guaranteed against their Spanish patrons, and a fair salary was assured for those who worked as peasants and farmers.

=== Establishment of the Inquisition in New Spain ===
During the government of Enríquez de Almanza, the Holy Office of the Inquisition (Tribunal del Santo Oficio) was formally established in New Spain; it was simultaneously established in Peru. Pedro Moya de Contreras, the first inquisitor in New Spain, arrived in 1571. Composed of a group of high-ranking bishops and sometimes led by the archbishop of Mexico City, the Inquisition had special instructions to oversee and control the religious practices of Spaniards and non-indigenous residents in the territory, and to eradicate any crypto-Jewish communities (judaizantes), as well as any Protestants. Indians were excluded from its jurisdiction.

This religious court became quite active. The first to be tried by the Inquisition in the Indies were two Englishmen and an Irishman, burnt at the stake in Mexico City April 15, 1574 for "Lutheran heresies". An estimated 200 people were tried in 1574, the year in which the first Autos de Fe were held. Most of these 200 people were burnt alive in public plazas or tortured to death in secret dungeons, both scattered throughout what is now downtown Mexico City. The viceroy was required to attend these ceremonies.

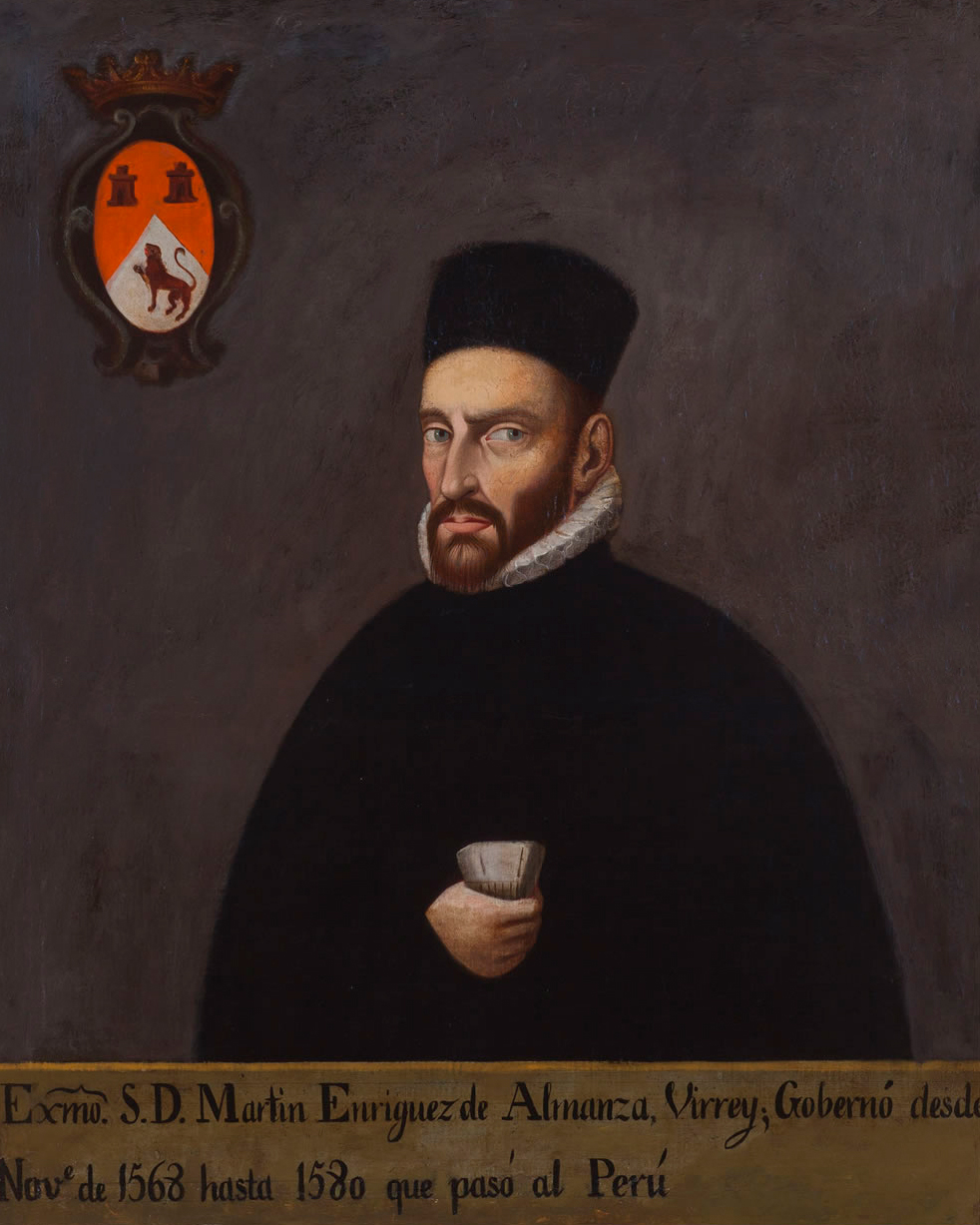
Portrait of Enríquez de Almanza, c. 1568

== Viceroy of Peru ==
King Philip II of Spain received outstanding comments about this viceroy, and he was aware of the obvious improvements made during his administration. In recognition of his labor, he was designated viceroy of Peru, Peru being a richer colony. Enríquez de Almanza sailed from the port of Acapulco on the Pacific in 1580. He died in Lima, Peru in 1583, still in office. The Audiencia governed New Spain until the arrival of the next viceroy, Lorenzo Suárez de Mendoza, 5th Count of Coruña.

In Lima people knew him as el Gotoso (The Goutish One) because of his ill health. He was unable to accomplish much as viceroy of Peru and died three years into his term, so that he is thus not counted among the great viceroys. However, in New Spain where he served 12 years as viceroy, he was considered "a wise administrator; he is generally credited with having raised the prestige of the viceroy's office."

Government offices
Preceded by Gastón de Peralta, 3rd Marquess of Falces	Viceroy of New Spain; 1568–1580	Succeeded by Lorenzo Suárez de Mendoza, 5th Count of Coruña
Preceded by Francisco de Toledo, Count of Oropesa	Viceroy of Peru; 1581–1583	Succeeded by Cristóbal Ramírez de Cartagena
