= Juan Jiménez =

Juan Jiménez may refer to:

- Juan Jiménez de Montalvo (born 1551), Spanish colonial administrator
- Juan Isidro Jimenez Pereyra (1846–1919), Dominican politician
- Juan Ramón Jiménez (1881–1958), Spanish poet
- Juan Jiménez Mayor (born 1964), Peruvian politician, Prime Minister of Peru
- Juan Jiménez Méndez (born 1886), Mexican politician, Governor of Oaxaca
- Juan Jiménez (baseball) (1949–2008), Dominican baseball player
- Juan Antonio Jiménez (born 1959), Spanish equestrian
- Juan Carlos Jiménez Rufino (born 1951), Argentine singer a.k.a. La Mona Jiménez
- Juanmi (footballer, born 1993), Spanish footballer

== See also ==
- Juan Giménez (1943-2020), Argentine comic book artist
