= Diego Ladrón de Guevara =

Viceroy of Peru (1710–1716) and Catholic bishop

Most Reverend Diego Ladrón de Guevara
- Bishop of Quito
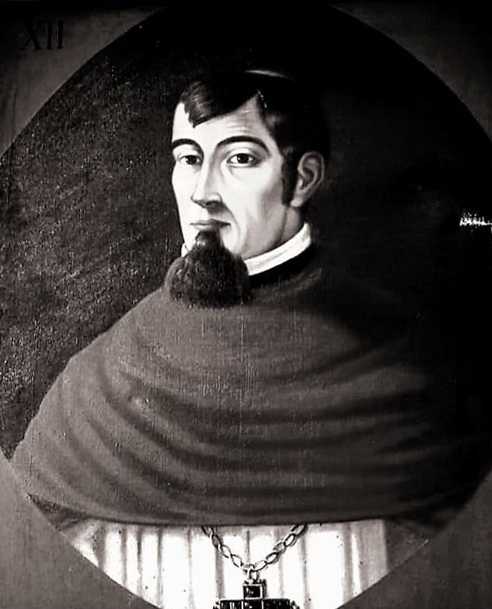
- Church: Catholic Church
- Archdiocese: Bishop of Quito
- In office: 1704–1717
- Predecessor: Sancho de Andrade de Figueroa
- Successor: Luis Francisco Romero
- Previous posts: Bishop of Panamá (1689–1699); Bishop of Ayacucho o Huamanga (1699–1704)

Orders
- Consecration: 1689 by Miguel Antonio de Benavides y Piedrola

Personal details
- Born: 1640 Sigüenza, Spain
- Died: 9 November 1718 (aged 77–78) Mexico City, Mexico

Doctor Diego Ladrón de Guevara Orozco Calderón (1641 in Cifuentes, Spain – September 9, 1718) was a Roman Catholic bishop and Spanish colonial administrator. From August 30, 1710, to March 2, 1716, he was viceroy of Peru.

== Before his term as viceroy ==
He studied theology at the University of Alcalá de Henares, where he was later professor of law. He also taught at the University of Sigüenza.

In 1689 he was appointed bishop of Panama and consecrated by Miguel Antonio de Benavides y Piedrola, Bishop of Cartagena. then in the Viceroyalty of Peru. That year he was jailed by order of Governor and Captain General José de Guzmán y Ávalos, with whom he had personal differences. In 1695 he added the additional responsibility of president of the Audiencia of Panama.

He served in Panama until 1699, when he was named bishop of Ayacucho (or Huamanga) in what is still Peru. He opened the University of San Cristóbal de Huamanga (founded in 1677) there, and was its first rector. This university was opposed by the older University of San Marcos. In 1703 he was appointed bishop of Quito (also in the Viceroyalty of Peru), where he served until his resignation in 1710 to take up the position of viceroy.

== His administration ==
He replaced Miguel Núñez de Sanabria, president of the Audiencia of Lima, who had been serving as viceroy in an interim capacity. Ladrón de Guevara had been named in the sealed instructions brought by the previous viceroy, Manuel de Oms y de Santa Pau as the successor in the event of Oms's death.

As viceroy, he increased the production of silver in the mines of Potosí, and stimulated production in other mines at San Nicolás, Cajatambo and Huancavelica. He limited the manufacture of aguardiente from sugar cane to authorized factories, which he taxed heavily. He had to take measures against the threat of privateers, in spite of the signing of the Peace of Utrecht in 1713, and against an uprising of slaves at the hacienda of Huachipa de Lima.

He approved the reconstruction of the cathedral of Lima, and the construction of some other churches, including La Buena Muerte and the convent of Mínimos de San Francisco de Paula. He established a chair of anatomy at the University of San Marcos. The Peace of Utrecht allowed the British to send ships and merchandise to the fair at Portobello.

== After his term as viceroy ==
He was denounced in the royal courts for embezzlement, and removed from office in 1716. He was replaced on an interim basis by Mateo de la Mata Ponce de León, president of the Audiencia of Lima. Ladrón de Guevara went to New Spain. Before his death there, he arranged that the remains of his relative, Diego Landa Calderón, former bishop of Yucatán, be returned to Spain. He died on September 9, 1718, in Mexico City and was buried in the cathedral there.

== External links and additional sources ==
- Cheney, David M. "Archdiocese of Panamá". Catholic-Hierarchy.org. (for Chronology of Bishops) ^{[self-published]}
- Chow, Gabriel. "Metropolitan Archdiocese of Panamá". GCatholic.org. (for Chronology of Bishops) ^{[self-published]}
- Cheney, David M. "Archdiocese of Ayacucho". Catholic-Hierarchy.org. (for Chronology of Bishops) ^{[self-published]}
- Chow, Gabriel. "Metropolitan Archdiocese of Ayacucho". GCatholic.org. (for Chronology of Bishops) ^{[self-published]}
- Cheney, David M. "Archdiocese of Quito". Catholic-Hierarchy.org. (for Chronology of Bishops) ^{[self-published]}
- Chow, Gabriel. "Metropolitan Archdiocese of Quito". GCatholic.org. (for Chronology of Bishops) ^{[self-published]}

Government offices
Preceded by Pedro José de Guzmán	Royal Governor of Panama; 1695–1696	Succeeded by Pedro Luis Henríquez de Guzmán
Preceded by Miguel Núñez de Sanabria	Viceroy of Peru; 1710–1716	Succeeded by Mateo de la Mata
Religious titles
Preceded by Lucas Fernández de Piedrahita	Bishop of Panamá; 1689–1699	Succeeded by Juan de Argüelles
Preceded by Mateo Delgado	Bishop of Ayacucho o Huamanga; 1699–1704	Succeeded by Francisco de Deza y Ulloa
Preceded by Sancho de Andrade de Figueroa	Archbishop of Quito; 1704–1717	Succeeded by Luis Francisco Romero
