= Lope García de Castro =

Spanish colonial administrator (1516–1576)

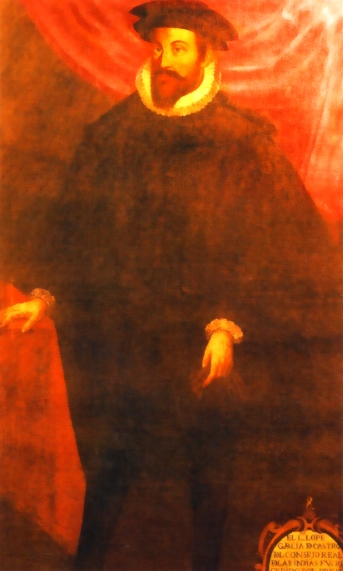

Interim Viceroy of Peru
- In office September 2, 1564 – November 26, 1569
- Monarch: Philip II
- Preceded by: Juan de Saavedra
- Succeeded by: Francisco de Toledo

Personal details
- Born: 1516 Villanueva de Valdueza
- Died: 8 January 1576 (aged 59–60)

Lope García de Castro (1516 - 8 January 1576) was a Spanish colonial administrator, member of the Council of the Indies and of the Audiencias of Panama and Lima. From September 2, 1564, to November 26, 1569, he was interim viceroy of Peru.

== Biography ==
He was born at Villanueva de Valdueza.

In 1563 he was sent to Panama by the Council of the Indies to apply the Council's decision to end the Audiencia of Guatemala and attach that territory to the Audiencia of Panama. He sailed from Spain on October 8, 1563, arriving in Panama in 1564. He served as governor of Panama until continuing on to Lima.

In February 1564, Peruvian Viceroy Diego López de Zúñiga y Velasco died suddenly or was killed. The president of the Audiencia of Lima, Juan de Saavedra briefly served as interim viceroy. García de Castro was sent from Panama to take over the positions of governor, captain general, and president of the Audiencia. He was in effect interim viceroy. He arrived in Lima on September 22, 1564, and served until 1569.

The Indians of Peru had an oral tradition referring to Pacific islands known to Hahuachimbi and Ninachumbi. These mythical islands came to the attention of the Spanish in Peru, and even before their discovery were known as the Solomon Islands (named for the biblical king) or the Islands of Gold. Viceroy García de Castro decided to send a naval expedition to the west to investigate whether these islands were real. He wrote to King Philip II that he was sending his nephew, Alvaro de Mendaña de Neira, with 100 men. The expedition consisted of two ships. It discovered Wake Island and the Solomon Islands.

He suspected the Inca of plotting rebellion in Chile and Argentina. After discovering some evidence to support this, he ordered all horses and firearms confiscated from the Indians.

In 1567 an expedition under Captain Martín Ruiz de Gamboa was sent to subdue the island of Chiloé (Chile). Ruiz met little resistance. He founded the city of Castro there, named for Viceroy García de Castro.

On August 21, 1565, King Philip created a royal mint in Lima, at the urging of a previous viceroy, Diego López de Zúñiga y Velasco, but it was in existence only briefly.

He died on 8 January 1576.

Government offices
Preceded by Juan de Saavedra (interim)	Viceroy of Peru (interim, as Dean of the Audiencia); 1564–1569	Succeeded by Francisco de Toledo
