= Bernardo de Iturriaza =

Spanish judge and colonial official

Bernardo de Iturriaza (1608 in Ezcaray, La Rioja, Spain – 1678 in Lima) was a Spanish judge and colonial official. In his capacity as president of the Audiencia of Lima he twice served as governor (interim viceroy) of Peru (1666–1667 and 1672–1674).

== Biography ==
He studied law at the University of Alcalá de Henares, qualifying in both civil and canon law. Afterwards he continued teaching at the University. After some years he was named to the chair of digesto y decretales (pandects and decretals).

Thereafter he began work in the Audiencia of Lima. In 1647 he was named alcalde for criminal law, and in 1652 he became an oidor (a judge in the Audiencia). He rose to the position of decano (president) of the Audiencia.

In the interval between the death of Viceroy Diego de Benavides, 8th Count of Santisteban in 1666 and the arrival of his replacement, Pedro Antonio Fernández de Castro, the following year, Iturriaza served as governor (interim viceroy) of Peru. This was from about March 1666 to about November 1667. He served again from about December 1672 to about August 1674, between the death of Fernández de Castro and the arrival of Baltasar de la Cueva Enríquez.

Iturriaza died in 1678 in Lima.

Government offices
Preceded by Diego de Benavides	Viceroy of Peru; 1666–1667	Succeeded by Pedro Antonio Fernández de Castro
Preceded by Pedro Antonio Fernández de Castro	Viceroy of Peru; 1672–1674	Succeeded by Baltasar de la Cueva Enríquez
