= Gaspar de Zúñiga, 5th Count of Monterrey =

Mexican politician

The Most Excellent The Count of Monterrey KOS
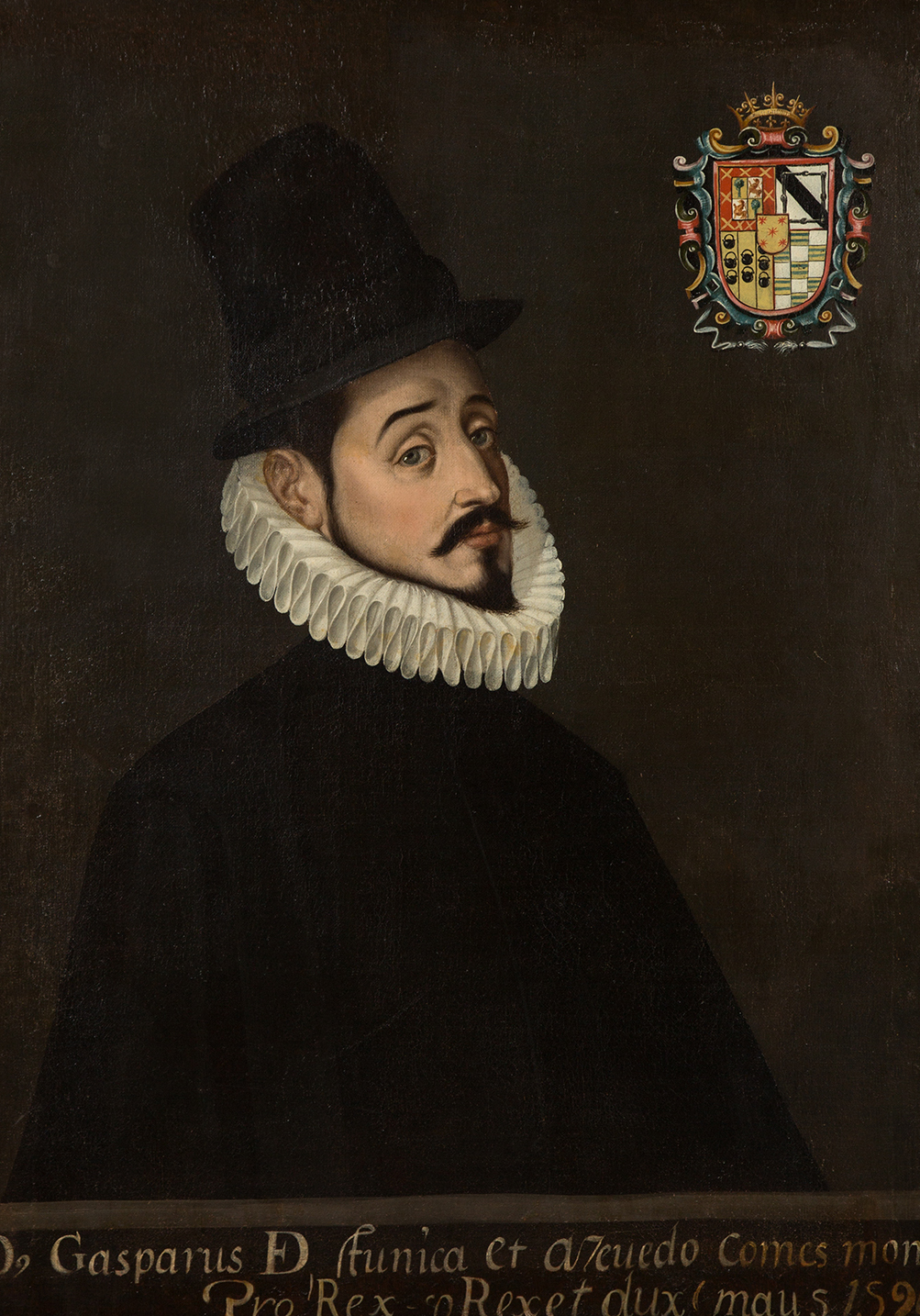

Viceroy of New Spain
- In office November 5, 1595 – October 26, 1603
- Monarchs: Philip II; Philip III
- Valido: Duke of Lerma
- Preceded by: Luis de Velasco
- Succeeded by: Juan de Mendoza

10th Viceroy of Peru
- In office January 18, 1604 – March 16, 1606
- Monarch: Philip III
- Valido: Duke of Lerma
- Preceded by: Luis de Velasco
- Succeeded by: Diego Núñez de Avendaño

Personal details
- Born: 1560 Monterrei, Spain
- Died: March 16, 1606 (aged 45–46) Lima, Peru

Gaspar de Zúñiga Acevedo y Fonseca, 5th Count of Monterrey (1560 – March 16, 1606) was a Spanish nobleman who was the ninth viceroy of New Spain. He governed from November 5, 1595, to October 26, 1603. From January 18, 1604, until his death in 1606, he was viceroy of Peru.

== Early service ==
De Zúñiga y Acevedo was born the eldest son of the fourth Count of Monterrei, Jerónimo de Acevedo y Zúñiga. He studied in Monterrei under the direction of Jesuit priests. In 1578 he entered the service of King Philip II. He participated in the Portuguese campaign, where he led the Galician militia, paying them out of his own pocket. De Zúñiga y Acevedo also took part in the defense of the port of A Coruña when it was attacked by the English corsair Francis Drake in 1589.

== As viceroy of New Spain ==
On May 28, 1595, de Zúñiga y Acevedo was nominated viceroy of New Spain. He arrived in the colony, at Veracruz, in mid-September, as the successor to Viceroy Luis de Velasco, marqués de Salinas. On November 5, 1595, he made his solemn entry into Mexico City, taking up the reins of government.

He increased taxes on the Indians, but he was said to pay personal attention to adjustments required of the Indians in order to prevent their being exploited. In 1596, the viceroy Count of Monterrey reported, in a letter sent to Philip II to justify the increase of the salary of the royal officials, that those had seized and burned some delinquents for the unspeakable sin of sodomy, although he does not give the number of victims or the circumstances of the event.

On September 20, 1596, Diego de Montemayor founded the city of Monterrey, Nuevo León. This city was named in the viceroy's wife's honor.

In 1597 pirates attacked the port of Campeche, taking over the center of the town and terrorizing the inhabitants. De Zúñiga y Acevedo ordered increased protection for the ports. He also moved the town of Veracruz from its old site to its present location, which was more secure.

In 1598 Philip II died, and Philip III succeeded him to the Spanish crown. In the same year, de Zúñiga approved the Juan de Oñate expedition into present day New Mexico, USA. In 1601, the Indians of Topia rose against the Spanish, but through the influence of Idefonso de la Mota, bishop of Guadalajara, they were pacified. The Jesuits subsequently established missions there, in the Tarahumara region.

=== Explorations ===
Among his first acts as viceroy was organizing an overland expedition to explore and colonize the north of the New Kingdom of León y Castilla (present day New Mexico), continuing a policy of his predecessor, the Viceroy Velasco. The famous expedition, under the command of Juan de Oñate, had been delayed at the suggestion of Velasco to review the agreement. Oñate would go on to serve as governor for the province and would found the ancient city of Santa Fe. Oñate official search did not locate the legendary Seven Cities of Gold believed to be within the provinces of Cíbola and Quivira.

He also sent two expeditions to explore the Pacific coast of Mexico. Sebastián Vizcaíno sailed from Acapulco in 1596 with three ships. On this expedition Vizcaíno founded La Paz, Baja California Sur, so named because of his friendly reception there by the Indians. He also discovered Cape San Sebastián.

A later expedition by Vizcaíno with the same mission sailed on May 5, 1602, with four ships. This expedition was more fruitful. Ensenada, Baja California was founded. San Diego Bay was explored and Catalina Island was named. The explorers reached as far north as Monterey Bay, Alta California, which Vizcaíno named in honor of the viceroy. Subsequent plans to colonize Alta California foundered when Zúñiga's successor, Juan de Mendoza, 3rd Marquis of Montesclaros, turned out to be much less favorable.

== As viceroy of Peru ==
On May 19, 1603, Zúñiga y Acevedo was named viceroy of Peru. He remained in New Spain until September, awaiting the arrival of his successor, Juan de Mendoza y Luna, marqués de Montesclaros. After the arrival of the new viceroy, the two met in Orizaba, midway between Veracruz and Mexico City. Here de Zúñiga y Acevedo hosted a week-long welcoming festival said to have cost more than a year's viceregal salary.

The new viceroy took over the administration of New Spain in October, and in that month de Zúñiga y Acevedo sailed from Acapulco for Lima.

Private affairs delayed him again in Panama and Paita. He did not enter Lima until November 28, 1604. There he finished the preparations for the dispatch of Pedro Fernandes de Queirós on a naval expedition to the South Seas. This expedition sailed on December 21, 1605. Shortly after that he died, still in office but without having had the opportunity to initiate reforms.

Government offices
Preceded by The Marquis of Salinas	Viceroy of New Spain; 1595–1603	Succeeded by The Marquis of Montesclaros
Preceded by The Marquis of Salinas	Viceroy of Peru; 1604–1606	Succeeded by Diego Núñez de Avendaño
Spanish nobility
Preceded by Jerónimo de Acevedo	Count of Monterrey; 1580–1606	Succeeded by Manuel de Acevedo
