= Diego Núñez de Avendaño =

Viceroy of Peru (died 1607)

Doctor Diego Núñez de Avendaño (died 1607, presumably in Lima, Peru) was oidor (judge) of the Royal Audiencia of Lima, and for a brief period in 1607, interim viceroy of Peru.

== Biography ==
Diego Núñez de Avendaño was the son of the prominent Spanish jurist and author Pedro Núñez de Avendaño.

He was a lawyer in the Royal Council (Reales Consejos). He obtained the privilege from King Philip II (dated April 10, 1565) to publish the collected works of his father, with the exception of Tratado de la caza (Treatise on the Hunt, Alcalá, 1543).

At the time of the death of Viceroy Gaspar de Zúñiga y Acevedo, Count of Monterrey in late 1606, Núñez de Avendaño was president of the Audiencia of Lima. In virtue of his position he became acting viceroy of Peru, but died early in 1607. A document dated February 15, 1607 named Doctor Alberto de Acuña to the Audiencia to replace Zúñiga y Acevedo after his death. Juan de Mendoza y Luna, marqués de Montesclaros replaced him as viceroy.

Government offices
Preceded by Gaspar de Zúñiga y Acevedo	Viceroy of Peru; 1607	Succeeded by Juan de Mendoza y Luna
