= Luis de Velasco, 1st Marquess of Salinas del Río Pisuerga =

Mexican politician

Luis de Velasco Marquess of Salinas
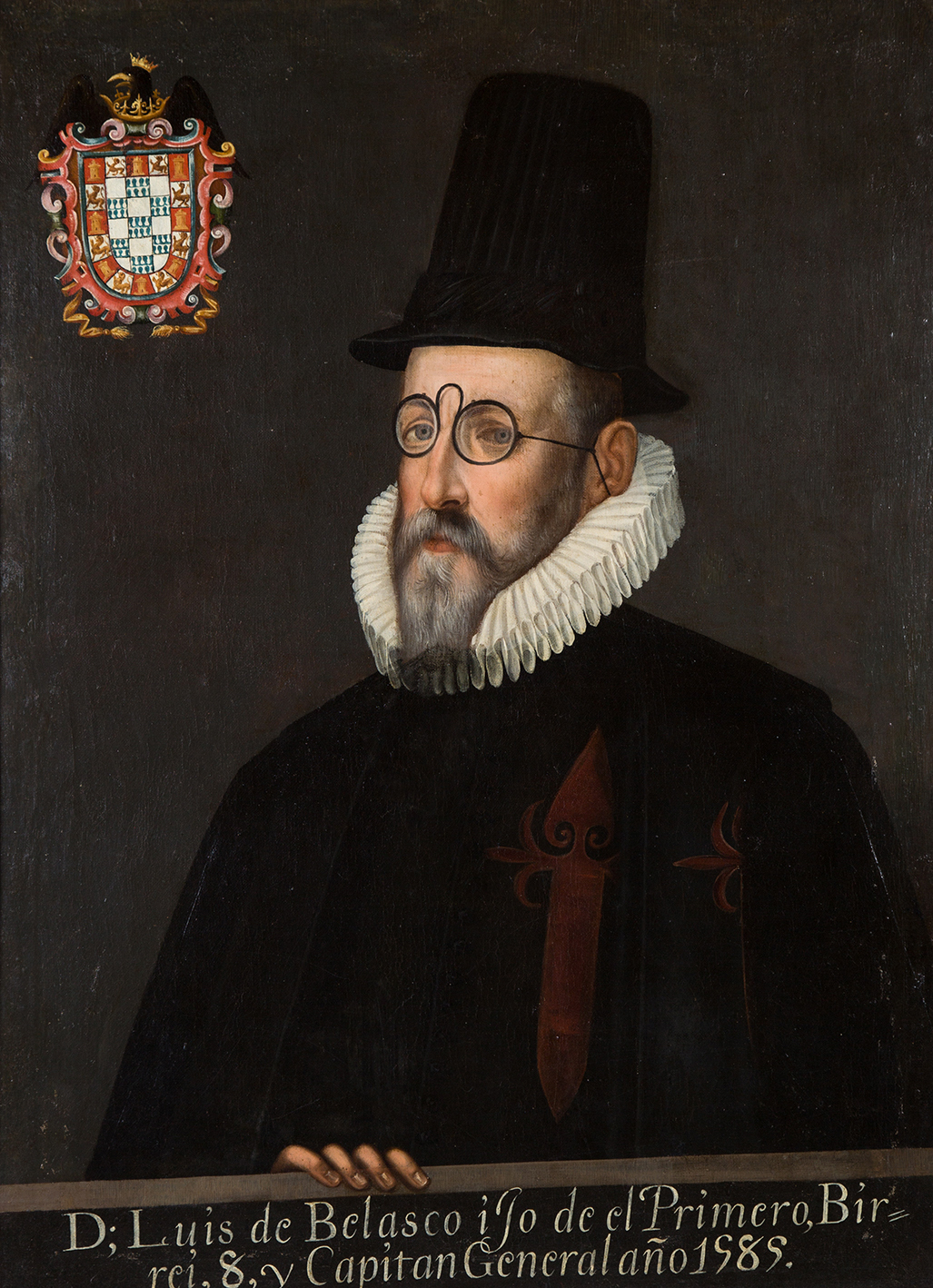

8th and 11th Viceroy of New Spain
- In office January 27, 1590 – November 5, 1595
- Monarch: Philip II
- Preceded by: Álvaro Manrique de Zúñiga
- Succeeded by: Gaspar de Zúñiga
- In office July 2, 1607 – June 19, 1611
- Monarch: Philip III
- Valido: Duke of Lerma
- Preceded by: Juan de Mendoza y Luna
- Succeeded by: García Guerra

9th Viceroy of Peru
- In office July 24, 1596 – January 18, 1604
- Monarchs: Philip II; Philip III
- Valido: Duke of Lerma
- Preceded by: García Hurtado de Mendoza
- Succeeded by: Gaspar de Zúñiga

Personal details
- Born: c. 1534 Carrión de los Condes
- Died: 7 September 1617 Seville

Luis de Velasco, 1st Marquess of Salinas del Río Pisuerga (c. 1534 – September 7, 1617) was a Spanish nobleman who was the ninth viceroy of New Spain from January 27, 1590 to November 4, 1595, and again from July 2, 1607, to June 10, 1611. In between he was viceroy of Peru for eight years, from July 24, 1596, to January 18, 1604. He was known as Luis de Velasco, hijo to distinguish him from his father, Luis de Velasco, the second viceroy of New Spain.

== Early life ==
Born in Carrión de los Condes, Luis de Velasco remained in Spain with his mother and siblings when his father, Luis de Velasco, was appointed Viceroy of New Spain. His brother, don Antonio de Velasco, was a "gentilhombre de la boca" to Prince Philip. The two brothers accompanied Philip to England when he married Queen Mary. They traveled on with the court to Brussels, where young don Luis was admitted to the military-religious order of Santiago. In about 1560 he joined his father in Mexico City where he passed the rest of his youth.

He married doña María de Ircio, the daughter of a conquistador, Martín de Ircio, and of the step-sister of the first viceroy, doña María de Mendoza. After the death of his father, he continued to live in Mexico and served as alderman in the capital. However, he became disgusted with Viceroy Álvaro Manrique de Zúñiga, 1st Marquess of Villamanrique and returned to Spain. He presented himself at the court of Philip II, and the king named him ambassador to Florence.

== First administration in New Spain ==
On July 19, 1589, Velasco received the appointment as the new viceroy of New Spain, replacing Manrique. Because the news that had reached Spain indicated that the colony was in turmoil, he was advised not to disembark at Veracruz, the usual port of entry. Instead he arrived at Tamiahua, in the province of Pánuco. On his arrival he realized that tranquility had been restored. He then sailed on to Veracruz, where he disembarked in the middle of December, 1589.

From Veracruz he traveled to Mexico City, taking possession of the government on January 27, 1590. There he was received as a native son, with great happiness by all classes.

In 1591 he obtained the pacification of the Chichimeca tribes that had been in constant revolt and outside of Spanish control. The chiefs had asked the Spanish to supply food. Velasco accepted, and a peace treaty was signed. To introduce the Chichimecas to the customs of the colony, 400 Tlaxcalteca families were sent to live with them. The Franciscans also founded four colonies among the Chichimecas, with their center at Zacatecas. In return, Velasco reduced the taxes that had been levied on the Indians and charged the Real Hacienda to supply lawyers to represent the tribes and ease their entry into the society of the colony. In autumn of 1595, Velasco selected and appointed Juan de Oñate governor and head of the latter's now famous expedition into North America.

He promoted industry in New Spain, particularly spinning and weaving. He inaugurated the Paseo de la Alameda in Mexico City, and improved the fortifications of San Juan de Ulúa in Veracruz.

== Viceroy of Peru ==
In 1595, Velasco was named viceroy of Peru. He embarked from Acapulco in November of that year. However, after eight years in Peru he found himself tired and sick, and asked to be relieved of the government so that he could return to New Spain. Upon his return, he devoted himself to his encomiendas Azcapotzalco and Teulitlán.

== Second administration in New Spain ==
On February 25, 1607, Velasco hijo was again named viceroy of New Spain, this time by the new king, Philip III. He took possession of the government on July 2. Immediately he took up a project to dig the Huehuetoca canal, for flood control. Heretofore during the rainy season, year after year, Mexico City had been flooded. The canal project was under the direction of Enrico Martínez, an engineer, and Juan Sánchez, a mathematician of the Society of Jesus. Work on the canal commenced on November 28, 1607.

In February 1609 a royal edict arrived in Mexico prohibiting once again the enslavement of the Indians. Velasco hijo rigorously enforced this decree against the encomenderos and the mineowners. Like his father, this viceroy was known as a defender of the Indians.

Also in 1609 rumors of an impending rebellion of Negroes circulated. Velasco took preventative measures, including sending an armed force under Captain Pedro González de Herrera to Puebla. Herrera was to combat the escaped slaves and rebels (Maroons) on the Rio Blanco, who preyed on travelers between Veracruz and Mexico City. The leader of the blacks, Gaspar Yanga, sent a letter to Captain Herrera. The letter outlined the mistreatment of the blacks that had led them to flee captivity. Velasco took cognizance of the letter, but not before a bloody battle was fought, with heavy losses on each side. Velasco then arranged for the escaped slaves to found their own village, San Lorenzo de los Negros, near Córdova.

=== Contacts with Japan ===
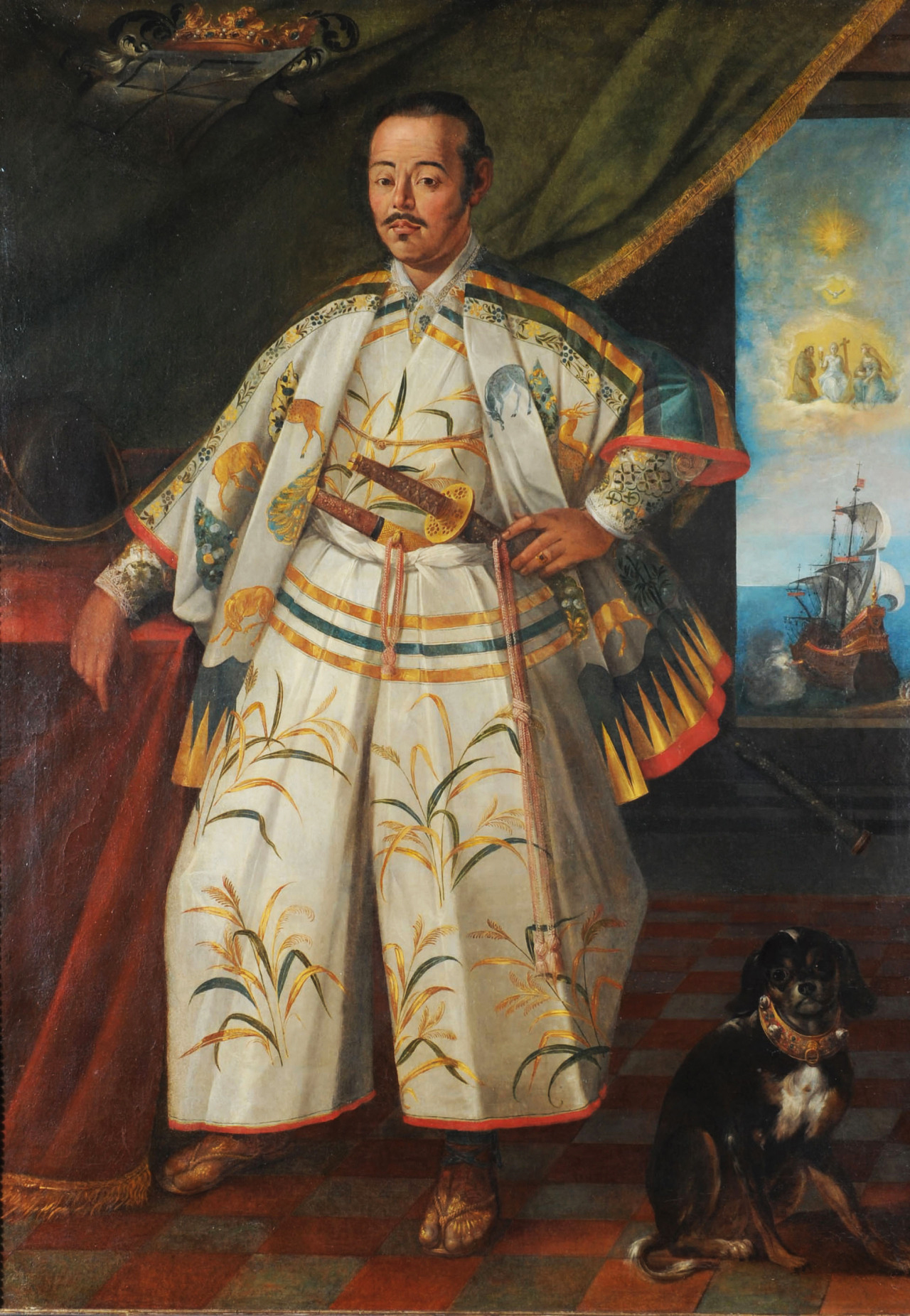
Hasekura Tsunenaga's portrait during his embassy to New Spain and Europe, by Claude Deruet, Coll. Borghese, Rome.

Luis de Velasco was involved in the establishment of trade and diplomatic relations with Japan. He received in 1610 the embassy of Luis Sotelo and Tanaka Shōsuke, which had sailed from Japan on the Japanese sailship San Buena Ventura, and agreed to send an ambassador to Japan in the person of the famous explorer Sebastián Vizcaíno, with the added mission of exploring the "gold and silver islands" which were thought to be east of the Japanese isles. Luis de Velasco confiscated the Japanese ship, fearful that the Japanese would further master the technique of trans-oceanic voyages.

Vizcaíno sailed from Acapulco in the San Bernardo on March 22, 1611, with the emissaries from Japan, arriving in Uraga on June 16 of that year. From there he traveled to Edo to meet the second shōgun Hidetada, and thence to Sumpa to meet with ex-shōgun Ieyasu. Vizcaíno, having lost his ship, sailed from Japan October 28, 1613, on board the Japanese galleon San Juan Bautista and arrived back at Acapulco on January 25, 1614. He was accompanied by Hasekura Tsunenaga, designated as the Japanese ambassador to Spain, and about 140 other Japanese.

== Council of the Indies ==
In 1610 King Philip III made him Marqués de Salinas as a reward for his services, and on December 27, 1610 named him president of the Council of the Indies. In 1611 Velasco departed New Spain to take up this position in the mother country. He served as president of the Council from December 1, 1610 until retiring old and infirm on August 7, 1617. He died one month later in Seville.

Government offices
Preceded by The Marquis of Villamanrique	Viceroy of New Spain; 1590–1595	Succeeded by The Count of Monterrey
Preceded by The Marquis of Cañete	Viceroy of Peru; 1596–1604	Succeeded by The Count of Monterrey
Preceded by The Marquis of Montesclaros	Viceroy of New Spain; 1607–1611	Succeeded by García Guerra
