= Diego Fernández de Córdoba, 1st Marquess of Guadalcázar =

Mexican politician (1578–1630)

Diego Fernández de Córdoba Marquess of Guadalcázar
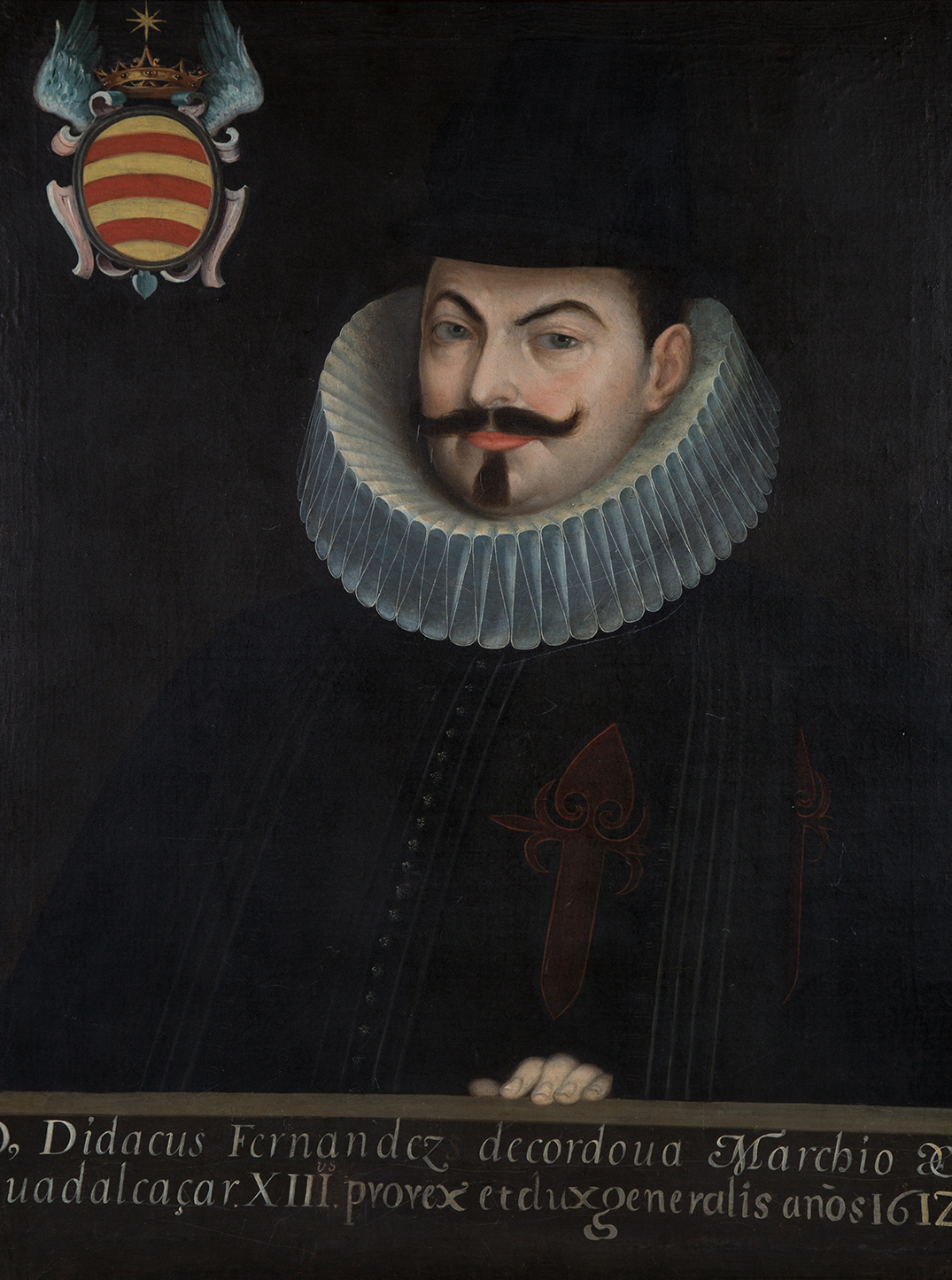

Viceroy of Peru
- In office 25 July 1622 – 14 January 1629
- Monarch: Philip IV
- Valido: Baltasar de Zúñiga; Count-Duke of Olivares
- Preceded by: Juan Jiménez de Montalvo
- Succeeded by: Luis Jerónimo de Cabrera

13th Viceroy of New Spain
- In office 18 October 1612 – 14 March 1621
- Monarch: Philip III
- Valido: Duke of Lerma; Cristóbal Gómez de Sandoval
- Preceded by: García Guerra
- Succeeded by: Juan Paz de Vallecillo

Personal details
- Born: February 9, 1578 Seville
- Died: October 6, 1630 (aged 52) Guadalcázar

Diego Fernández de Córdoba y López de las Roelas, 1st Marquess of Guadalcázar (9 February 1578 – 6 October 1630), was Viceroy of Mexico from October 18, 1612, to March 14, 1621, and Viceroy of Peru from July 25, 1622, to January 14, 1629.

== Early life ==
He was born in Seville. In 1598, aged 20, he was in Central Europe as an ambassador with a mandate to travel and bring back to Spain the 13- to 14-year-old orphaned bride Margaret of Austria (daughter of Archduke Charles II of Austria and Maria Anna of Bavaria), the first, and only wife of king Philip III of Spain, being awarded the title of Marquess of Guadalcázar, in 1609.

== Viceroy of New Spain ==
Fernández de Córdoba was named viceroy of New Spain by King Philip III of Spain, for whom he had served as lord of the bedchamber. Early in his mandate in New Spain, he sent Captain Diego Martínez de Hurdaide to suppress an uprising of the Tehuecos, an ethnic subgroup of the Cahuitas of Sinaloa. Martínez de Hurdáiz was successful after fighting several battles. The viceroy also founded many cities, including Lerma (1613), Córdoba (1618), and Guadalcázar (1620).

The Mexican Córdoba, in what is now the state of Veracruz, was founded in part to help suppress marauding bands of escaped black slaves that preyed on travelers between the port of Veracruz and Mexico City. He also completed the Fort of San Diego in Acapulco, overlooking the Pacific Ocean.

In 1616, the drainage system for the Valley of Mexico, long under construction but suspended since 1614, was restarted. King Philip III had chosen the Dutch hydrographer Adrian Boot to investigate the drainage project and take charge of operations. Boot had been in charge of numerous drainage projects in France. He traveled to Mexico City (at a salary of 100 ducats a month) and reviewed the work already done. His opinion was that it would not serve to drain the lakes, but that it could be used to divert the Cuautitlán river, the major cause of the nearly annual floods. Engineer Enrico Martínez offered to complete the diversion with 300 men and 100,000 pesos, but work was delayed pending approval of the king.

On November 16, 1616, another, particularly bloody, Indian insurrection broke out, this time among the Tepehuanes and neighboring tribes in the north. It was led by a cacique claiming to be the Son of the Sun and God of Heaven and Earth. The rebels quickly killed some Jesuit missionaries and 200 Spaniards and mestizos of various ages and both sexes. The governor of Durango, with aid sent by the viceroy, raised a militia. After three months of intense fighting, the rebels were largely defeated.

Also in 1616, a drought led to crop failure and famine in New Spain. In 1620 a fire destroyed a large part of Veracruz.

Fernández also improved the sanitation and water supply of Mexico City, completing the aqueduct from Chapultepec in 1620. This aqueduct consisted of 900 arches. He established a tribunal to regulate the buying, selling and taxing of mercury metal used in gold and silver metallurgy, which the mines of New Spain had begun to produce in some quantity at Huancavelica. Due to his various improvements, he received the nickname el Buen Virrey (The Good Viceroy).

== Viceroy of Peru ==
In Peru, Fernández de Córdoba reformed the fiscal system and stopped the inter-family rivalry that was bloodying the domain, mainly in the fabulous silver city of Potosí, between vicuñas and vascongados. In 1624 he fortified Lima against pirate attacks, including those by Jacques l'Hermite, a Flemish merchant, explorer and admiral known for his journey around the globe with the Nassau Fleet (1623–1626) and for his blockade and raid on Callao in 1624 during that same voyage in which he also died.

In 1629, Viceroy Diego Fernández de Córdoba gave up his charge and returned to Spain, where he died the following year, at Guadalcázar, aged 52.

Government offices
Preceded by García Guerra; Archbishop of Mexico	Viceroy of New Spain; 1612–1621	Succeeded by Diego Carrillo de Mendoza, 1st Marquis of Gelves
Preceded by Juan Jiménez de Montalvo; President of Audiencia	Viceroy of Peru; 1622–1629	Succeeded by Luis Jerónimo de Cabrera, 4th Count of Chinchón
