= Miguel Núñez de Sanabria =

Doctor Miguel Núñez de Sanabria (1645 or 1646 – 1729) was a Spanish official in Peru and an oidor (judge) of the Audiencia of Lima. Twice he was interim viceroy of Peru (September 1705 to May 1707 and April 22 to September 14, 1710), in virtue of his office as president of the Audiencia.

== Biography ==
Núñez de Sanabria was born in Lima. He was a knight of the Order of Santiago and a professor of laws at the University of San Marcos, Lima. He bought a position as criminal alcalde before the Audiencia of Lima, and later became an oidor of the same Audiencia. He had much influence with his fellow oidores.

As president of the Audiencia at the time of the death of Viceroy Melchor Portocarrero, 3rd Count of Monclova on September 15, 1705, Núñez de Sanabria took over the government of the colony on an interim basis, until Manuel de Oms y de Santa Pau succeeded him in May 1707. He served as interim viceroy again, briefly, from April to September 1710. He was still a member of the Audiencia in 1715.

He left Peru for Spain, where he was a member of the Council of the Indies and also of the Council of War. He died in Madrid in 1729.

Government offices
Preceded by Melchor Portocarrero	Viceroy of Peru; 1705–1707	Succeeded by Manuel de Oms y de Santa Pau
Preceded by Manuel de Oms y de Santa Pau	Viceroy of Peru; 1710	Succeeded by Diego Ladrón de Guevara
