= Juan de Saavedra =

Juan de Saavedra was a soldier under the command of Diego de Almagro. During the first expedition to Chile in 1535, Almagro sent Saavedra to reconnoiter the Chilean coast in the ship that had brought reinforcements from Peru. Saavedra sailed as far as Alimapu, which he named Valparaíso after his birthplace in Spain.

Upon his return from the expedition, Hernando Pizarro attempted to enlist him in the Peruvian civil war, but Saavedra chose not to take sides. When Saavedra learned that Cristóbal Vaca de Castro had arrived in Peru as royal governor with full powers, he joined him. He distinguished himself at the Battle of Chupas on 16 September 1542. He had three sons.

Government offices
Preceded by Diego López de Zúñiga, 4th Count of Nieva	Viceroy of Peru (interim, as Dean of the Audiencia); 1564	Succeeded by Lope García de Castro (interim)
