= Fernando Torres de Portugal y Mesía =

Viceroy of Peru (died 1592)

Fernando Torres de Portugal y Mesía Count of Villadompardo
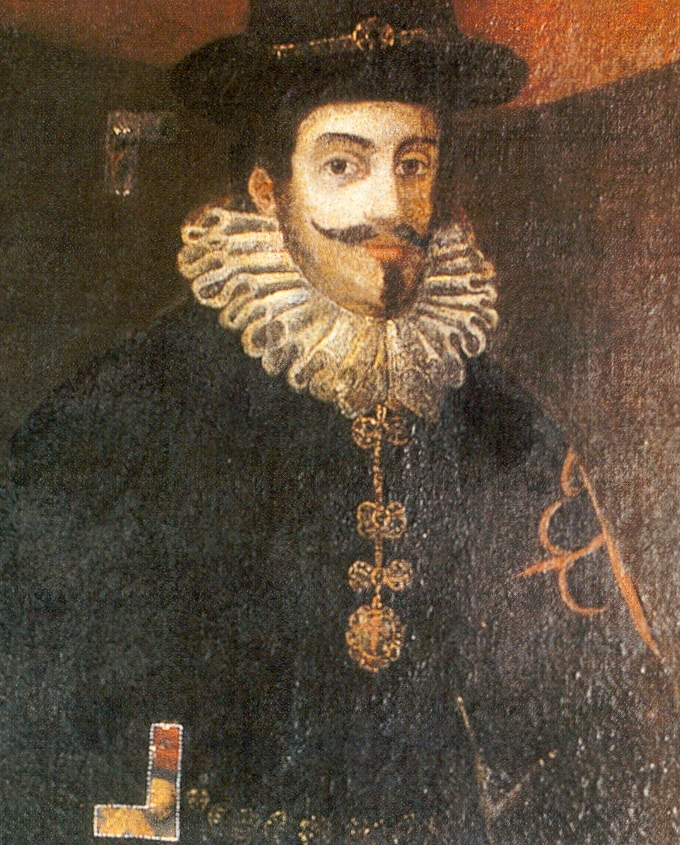

7th Viceroy of Peru
- In office March 31, 1584 – November 20, 1589
- Monarch: Philip II
- Preceded by: Cristóbal Ramírez de Cartagena
- Succeeded by: García Hurtado de Mendoza

Personal details
- Born: Villardompardo
- Died: 18 October 1592 Jaén

Fernando Torres de Portugal y Mesía Venegas y Ponce de León, 1st Count of Villadompardo was Spanish viceroy of Peru from 1584 to 20 November 1589.

== Biography ==
In 1576 he was named Count of Villadompardo by King Philip II.

He was named viceroy on 31 March 1584. On 30 April 1586, during his administration, Isabel Flores de Oliva, later Saint Rose of Lima, was born. The Lima people knew him as el Temblecón (The Quaking One), from the frequent nervous shaking in his hands.

The English corsair Thomas Cavendish appeared off the coast. On 9 July 1586 a strong earthquake struck Lima and Callao, and an associated tsunami did some damage in Callao. The first books printed in Peru were produced by Antonio Ricardo, a printer from Turin settled in Lima.

Torres de Portugal founded his entailed estate (mayorazgo) in Seville on 12 October 1592.

Government offices
| Preceded by Cristóbal Ramírez de Cartagena | Viceroy of Peru; 1584–1589 | Succeeded by The Marquis of Cañete |
