= Mateo de la Mata Ponce de León =

Spanish colonial official in Peru

Mateo de la Mata Ponce de León (sometimes Mateo de la Mata y Ponce de León) (b. Requena, Valencia, Spain – d. November 16, 1720, Lima) was a Spanish colonial official in Peru. He was president of the Audiencia of Quito from 1691 to 1699. (Quito was then part of the Viceroyalty of Peru.) From March 2 to August 15, 1716, he served as interim viceroy of Peru.

== Early career ==
Mateo de la Mata was born in Requena in eastern Spain. His parents were Mateo de Cuenca Mata and Isabel Ponce de León Iranzú. He studied at Colegio Mayor de San Ildefonso for eight years. He earned a bachelor's degree in canon law from the University of Salamanca and a licentiate from the University of Osuna. He was a knight of the military Order of Calatrava.

He was an oidor (judge) in the Audiencia of Santa Fe de Bogotá (es) (also part of the Viceroyalty of Peru), beginning in August 1674. On October 31, 1680, he was promoted to criminal alcalde in Lima. During this time, he married Luisa de Céspedes, a native of Lima and daughter of Juan Antonio de Céspedes y Toledo, knight of the Order of Santiago, and María de Arcos y Aguilar, also a native of Lima. From January 26, 1687, he was an oidor in the Audiencia of Lima.

== As president of the Audiencia of Quito ==
Mata Ponce de León was named president of the Audiencia of Quito by a decree dated October 27, 1689, but he did not occupy the position until January 10, 1691. He governed until 1699. At this point, he was a lawyer and oidor in Lima, with lengthy experience in public administration. As was the custom in the Audiencia of Quito, for the first two years of his administration he was also visitador general (inspector).

When Mata assumed the presidency in Quito, nearly all the buccaneers had abandoned the Pacific. Nevertheless, he had to address the continuing effects of nearly a decade of earlier, devastating pirate attacks. He assumed the responsibility of building the new city of Guayaquil. In 1693, he sent the oidor Cristóbal de Cevallos y Borja to supervise the design and construction of Guayaquil. The corregidor of Guayaquil, Fernando Ponce de León, died in 1694 and Mata named Oidor Cevallos to fill the position on an interim basis pending the arrival of a new corregidor with an appointment from the king. In 1696, Mata traveled to Guayaquil to inspect and supervise the work there.

During his government, the institutions of the Audiencia were strengthened and the economic situation improved. On the other hand, there was a series of great natural catastrophes, such as the 1692 earthquake at Latacunga, in which 8,000 of the 22,000 inhabitants perished. In 1693, a plague struck Quito and the towns of the Andean highlands. Mata made sure the sick were aided and medicines were distributed, applying some of his own money to the purpose. There was also a severe drought during the last seven years of the seventeenth century. Finally, on June 20, 1698, another earthquake destroyed what little of Latacunga had been reconstructed, and also badly affected Ambato and Riobamba. There were many deaths. Mata went to the affected towns to aid in the relief.

== Later career ==
In 1699, after his term as president of the Audiencia of Quito, Mata again became oidor in Lima. Thereafter, the king offered to promote him to a place in the Council of the Indies as a reward for his services, but Mata preferred to remain in the administration in Lima. In 1716, viceroy Diego Ladrón de Guevara, who had been bishop of Quito, was removed as viceroy. Mata, in virtue of his position as deacon of the Audiencia of Lima, was named interim governor and captain general of the Viceroyalty of Peru. He occupied this position from March 2, 1716, to August 15 of the same year. He died in Lima on November 16, 1720.

Government offices
Preceded by Diego Ladrón de Guevara	Viceroy of Peru; 1716	Succeeded by Diego Morcillo Rubio de Auñón
