= Cristóbal Ramírez de Cartagena =

Viceroy of Peru

Cristóbal Ramírez de Cartagena was a licenciado and Spanish colonial administrator in Peru. He was president of the Audiencia of Lima at the death of Viceroy Martín Enríquez de Almanza in 1583. In this capacity, he served as head of the government of Peru (acting viceroy) for part of the year 1584. The other oidores (members of the Audiencia) were Licenciado Juan Bautista Monzón and Doctors Pedro de Arteaga y Mendiola and Alonso Criado de Castilla.

He was soon replaced in the position of viceroy by Fernando Torres de Portugal y Mesía.

Government offices
Preceded by Martín Enríquez de Almanza	Viceroy of Peru; 1584	Succeeded by Fernando Torres de Portugal y Mesía
