= Juan de Mendoza y Luna, Marquis of Montesclaros =

Mexican politician

Juan de Mendoza y Luna Marquis of Montesclaros
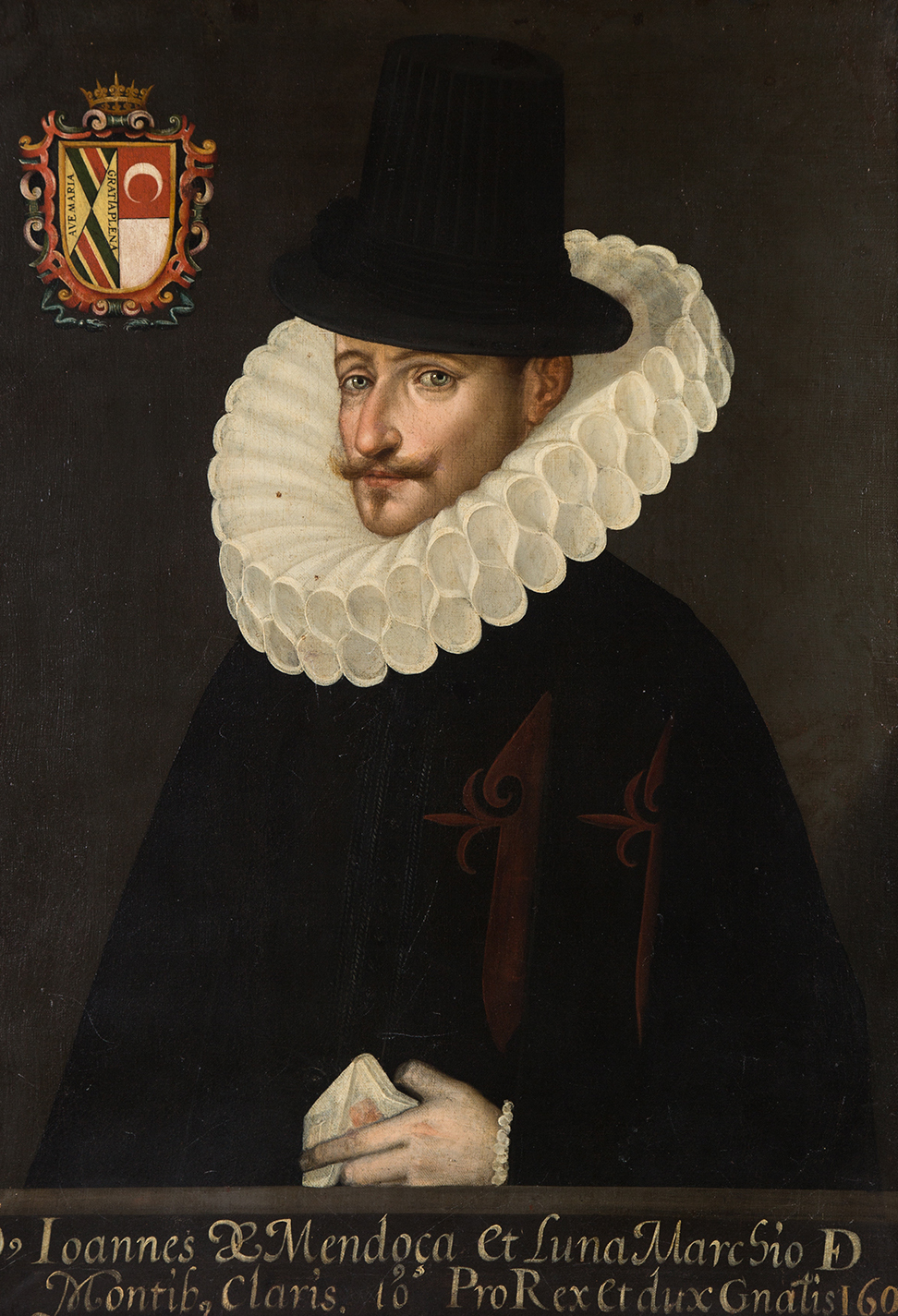

10th Viceroy of New Spain
- In office October 26, 1603 – July 2, 1607
- Monarch: Philip II
- Valido: Duke of Lerma
- Preceded by: Gaspar de Zúñiga Acevedo y Fonseca
- Succeeded by: Luis de Velasco

11th Viceroy of Peru
- In office December 21, 1607 – December 18, 1615
- Monarch: Philip III
- Valido: Duke of Lerma
- Preceded by: Diego Núñez de Avendaño
- Succeeded by: Francisco de Borja y Aragón

Personal details
- Born: January 1571 Guadalajara
- Died: 9 October 1628 (aged 57) Madrid
- Parent(s): Luis de Velasco y Ruiz de Alarcón & Isabel Manrique de Padilla

Juan de Mendoza y Luna, 3rd Marquess of Montesclaros (January, 1571 – October 9, 1628) was a Spanish nobleman, man of letters, and the tenth viceroy of New Spain. He governed from October 27, 1603 to July 2, 1607. Thereafter he was viceroy of Peru, from December 21, 1607 to December 18, 1615. After returning to Spain, he became advisor to the king and a high official in the Court.

== Youth and early career ==
Juan de Mendoza y Luna was born in Guadalajara in January 1571. He was the posthumous son of the 2nd Marqués de Montesclaros. He was raised by his mother, Isabel Manrique de Padilla.

He served with distinction in the army of the Duke of Alba in the Portuguese campaign, as a captain of lancers. For his service, he was awarded the Order of Caballero de Santiago in 1591. Later he was governor of Seville, where he first became acquainted with the affairs of the Indies. On May 19, 1603 the Crown named him viceroy of New Spain.

== As viceroy of New Spain ==
He made his formal entry into Mexico City on October 26, 1603, accompanied by his wife Ana de Mendoza, and assumed the reins of government. He immediately accused his predecessor, Gaspar de Zúñiga y Acevedo, Count of Monterrey of excessive spending and of exceeding his authority. Plans to colonize Alta California in the wake of Sebastián Vizcaíno's exploration were cancelled.

In August 1604 there was another major inundation of Mexico City. Damage was extensive. The viceroy initially suggested moving the capital to the nearby hills of Tacubaya, but this was deemed too expensive. Then he decided to finish the drainage canal of Huehuetoca, but this was a project requiring many years and the labor of 15,000 Indians to complete. In the meantime he repaired the dikes constructed under Viceroy Luís de Velasco, at the same time paving the streets of San Antonio Abad, Chapultepec, San Cristóbal and Guadalupe. Nevertheless, parts of the city remained submerged for a year.

Mendoza y Luna also constructed an aqueduct on stone arches that conducted water from the springs on Chapultepec to the center of the city. He cleaned the water channels and paved many streets with cobbles.

He lifted restrictions on Indians returning to their land to live.

== Later career and death ==
On November 20, 1606, Mendoza y Luna was named viceroy of Peru, with instructions to remain in New Spain until the arrival of his successor. The new viceroy, Luis de Velasco, 1st Marquess of Salinas del Río Pisuerga, arrived in July of the following year, and Mendoza sailed from Acapulco for Lima in that month.

He served as viceroy of Peru until 1615. During his government in Lima the famous Stone Bridge and the Alameda de los Descalzos of that city were built. He returned to Spain the following year, and served as counselor of state and of war. In 1621 King Philip IV made him a grandee of Spain. Subsequently, he was president of the Council of Hacienda (treasury) (1623-1626), and also of the Council of Aragon (1628).

He died in Madrid on October 9, 1628, at the age of 57.

Government offices
Preceded by Gaspar de Zúñiga y Acevedo, Count of Monterrey	Viceroy of New Spain; 1603–1607	Succeeded by Luis de Velasco, marqués de Salinas
Preceded by Diego Núñez de Avendaño	Viceroy of Peru; 1607–1615	Succeeded by Francisco de Borja y Aragón
