= Diego López de Zúñiga, 4th Count of Nieva =

Don Diego López de Zúñiga Count of Nieva Caballero de Santiago
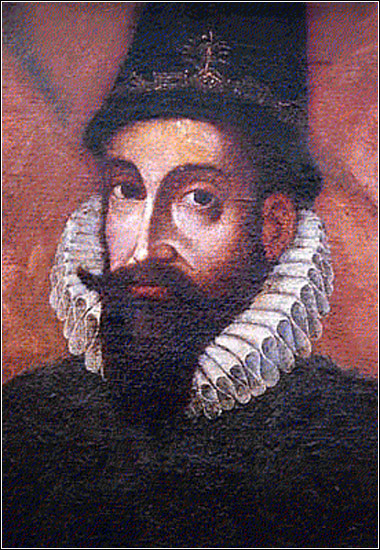

4th Viceroy of Peru
- In office April 17, 1561 – February 20, 1564
- Monarch: Philip II
- Preceded by: The Marquis of Cañete
- Succeeded by: Hernando de Saavedra

Personal details
- Born: c. 1510 Valladolid, Spain
- Died: February 20, 1564 Lima, Peru
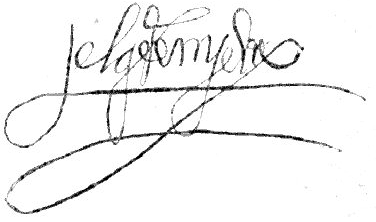
- Signature

Diego López de Zúñiga y Velasco, 4th Count of Nieva (Spanish: Diego López de Zúñiga y Velasco, cuarto conde de Nieva) (c. 1510 – February 20, 1564 in Lima, Peru) was the fourth viceroy of Peru, from April 17, 1561, to his death on February 20, 1564.

== Early career ==
López de Zúñiga was a knight of the military Order of Santiago, and from 1553 to 1559, Governor of Galicia. He was named Peruvian viceroy in late 1560 by King Philip II to replace Andrés Hurtado de Mendoza, 3rd Marquis of Cañete, who had been recalled. López de Zúñiga arrived in Lima and took up the office on February 20, 1561. After his arrival in Peru but before reaching the capital, he sent impertinent messages to his predecessor, just before the death of the latter. Some said that the recall and the insulting communications from López de Zúñiga had brought about the death of Hurtado de Mendoza.

== Viceroy of Peru ==
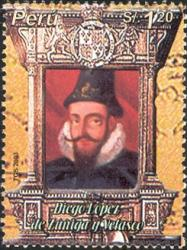
Viceroy López de Zúñiga

On December 14, 1561, he ordered Gómez de Tordoya to explore the River Tono, and on December 24, 1561, he commissioned Juan Nieto to conquer the territory of Camaná.

In 1562, the city of Santiago del Estero (today in Tucumán province, Argentina) was founded by Francisco de Aguirre on orders of the viceroy. The following year the Audiencia of Quito was established. López de Zúñiga also founded the city of Safia (Santiago de Miraflores) and directed Cristóbal de Valverde to found San Gerónimo de Ica. He founded the town of Arnedo (now Chancay) with the intention of moving the University of San Marcos there, for its tranquility.

He began the construction of the entrances that surround the Plaza Mayor in Lima. These were destroyed in the earthquake of October 20, 1687, but later rebuilt.

In addition, he directed the separation of the diocese of Chile from that of Peru. He organized and improved schools for the sons of Indigenous leaders. Doña Ana de Solórzano founded a school for poor girls in 1562. López de Zúñiga favored the monasteries, ordered the construction of an aqueduct to bring potable water to Lima, and passed laws for the improvement of the government of the colony. During his term in office he sent 651,000 ducats to the royal treasury in Spain. He was the first viceroy of Peru to introduce the pomp of a viceregal court, with much attention paid to details of etiquette, ceremony and precedence.

== Death ==
On 1 February 1564, he issued an edict imposing a 10 p.m. curfew in the city of Lima. In the early hours of 20 February 1564, four masked men were reportedly seen violating the curfew in the street of Trapitos. They positioned themselves beneath one of the balconies overlooking the street. Shortly afterwards, a rope ladder was lowered from the balcony and a man wrapped in a cape began to descend. Before he reached the ground, the four men attacked him with sandbags.

According to contemporary accounts, there was a single witness to the assault, generally identified as Pedro de Zárate, a young man standing on a nearby balcony of the Zárate family residence. After alerting his household slaves, he went with them to investigate. They found the victim dead and the assailants gone, and discovered that the victim was Viceroy López de Zúñiga y Velasco, apparently returning from a late-night visit. Zárate was the son of one of the judges of the Audiencia of Lima, which was convened to decide how to proceed. The court resolved to transfer the body to the viceregal palace and to announce officially that the viceroy had died suddenly of apoplexy.

Despite the official version, rumours quickly circulated offering an alternative explanation. According to these accounts, the woman involved was Catalina López de Zúñiga, a cousin of the viceroy and wife of Rodrigo Manrique de Lara, who was said to have hired the assassins.

This version of events is the one most frequently repeated in later narratives, but it is not certain that it is accurate. The viceroy was known for his amorous affairs, and his reputation may have contributed to the spread of such stories. At least one medical study cited in the references has argued, on the basis of available evidence, that the viceroy died of a stroke, presumably in his palace.

The body of López de Zúñiga y Velasco was interred in the church of San Francisco in Lima and was later transferred to Spain.

Government offices
Preceded by The Marquis of Cañete	Viceroy of Peru; 1561–1564	Succeeded by Juan de Saavedra
