= Manuel de Oms =

Spanish diplomat, man of letters and colonial official

Manuel de Oms Marquess of Castelldosrius
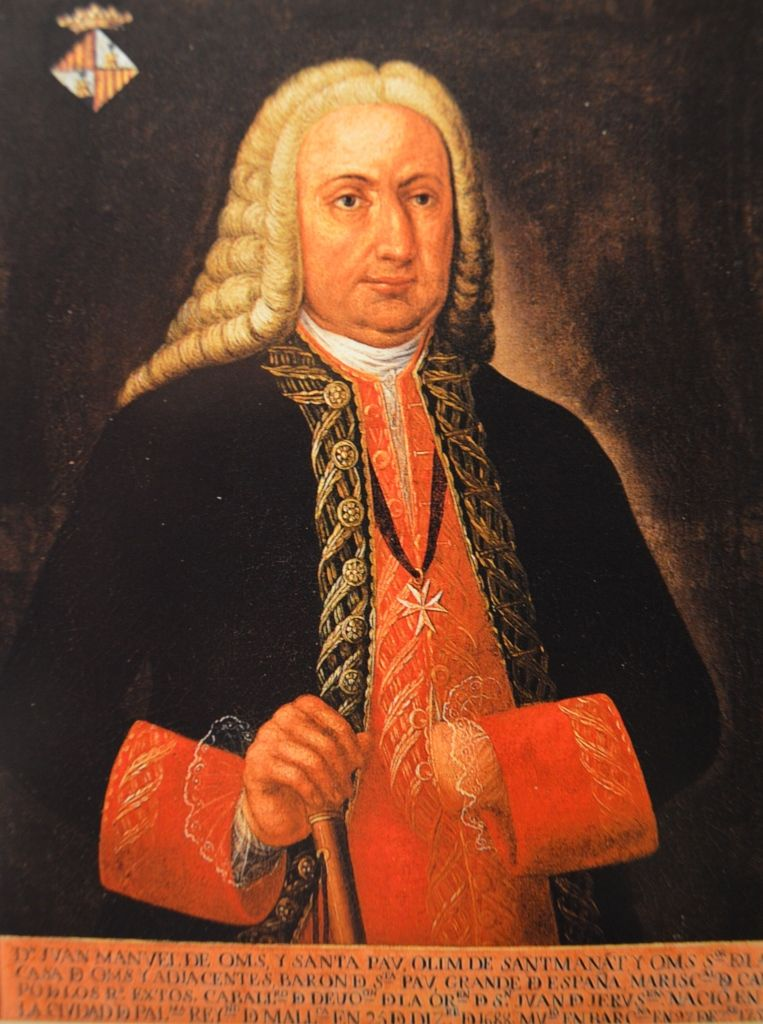

24th Viceroy of Peru
- In office July 7, 1707 – April 22, 1710
- Monarch: Philip V
- Preceded by: Juan Peñalosa y Benavides
- Succeeded by: Miguel Núñez de Sanabria

Personal details
- Born: 1651 Barcelona
- Died: 24 April 1710 (aged 58–59)

Don Manuel de Oms y Santa Pau, 1st Marquess of Castelldosrius, Grandee of Spain (sometimes marqués de Castell dos Rius) (1651 – 24 April 1710) was a Spanish diplomat, man of letters, and colonial official. From July 7, 1707, to April 22, 1710, he was viceroy of Peru.

== Before becoming viceroy ==
Manuel de Oms y de Santa Pau was born in Barcelona and belonged to a noble family of Catalonia. He was governor of Tarragona from 1677 and ambassador to Portugal from 1681. In 1698, Charles II, the last Habsburg king of Spain, named him ambassador to the court of Louis XIV in Paris. Oms was a francophile who favored the Bourbons in the War of the Spanish Succession. During the war, he took the part of the Duke of Anjou, the future Philip V of Spain. He it was who informed the French king that Charles had named the Duke of Anjou as his heir, with the words Señor, desde este momento no hay Pirineos ("Lord, from this moment there are no more Pyrenees.").

Charles II granted him the title of Marquess of Castelldosrius in 1696, and a Grandeeship, which was later attached to the title.

As a reward for his support, the Philip V named him viceroy of Peru in 1704, although he did not occupy the post until 1707.

== As viceroy of Peru ==
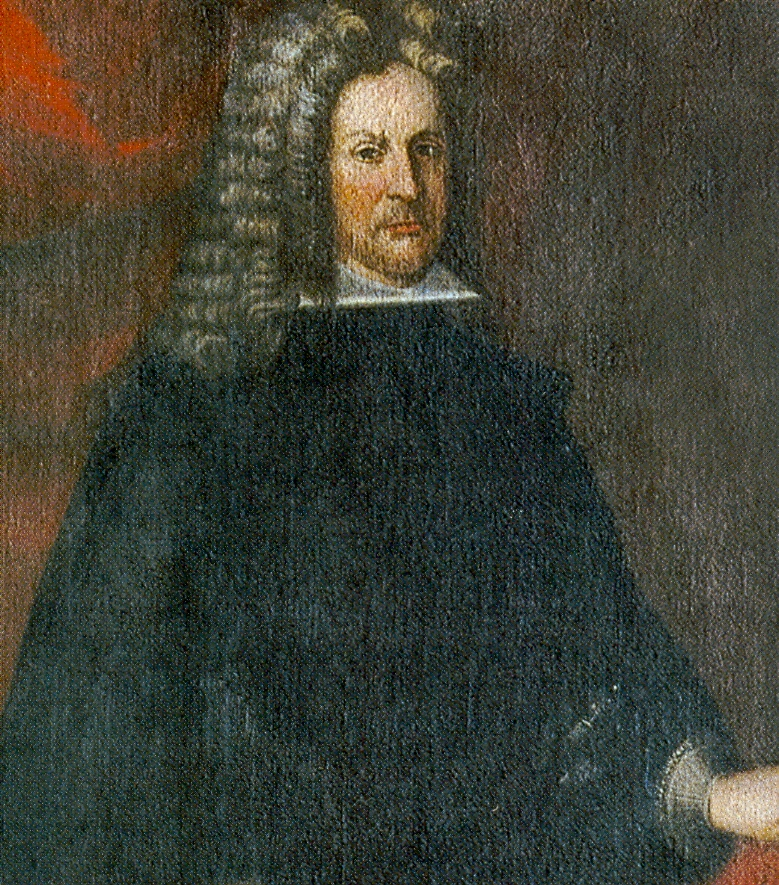
Manuel de Oms as viceroy of Peru

He took up his position as viceroy on July 7, 1707. He was able to send back an enormous sum of money (1,600,000 pesos) to the king to cover some of the costs of the war. This was possible in part because of the discovery of the mines in Caraboya. The collection of the money caused many protests, especially among the merchants, who brought suit against the viceroy many times in the Tribunal del Consulado. The merchants also opposed his opening of the port of Callao to French shipping.

To this problem were added others: the increase in French contraband and the English attacks on the coast, especially those of Charles Wager and Thomas Colb in 1708 and those of Woodes Rogers between 1709 and 1711. To deal with the attacks, the viceroy tried to form a navy, recruiting men by means of a levy.

In 1709 he was accused of embezzlement and dealing in contraband. French merchandise had saturated the market, but most of it was landed at Pisco without duty being paid. (Pisco was a small port about 200 km south of Lima.) Members of the viceroy's family were apparently involved in the contraband. He was nearly stripped of his office, but the favor of the king and the large amounts of money he was remitting to Spain worked in his favor. His property in Catalonia was, however, confiscated, but was returned to his heirs in 1714.

He did reach an agreement with the merchants, whereby in return for their financial help he would expel the French from the viceroyalty. This was not a success, because the treasure ships he sent back from Panama to Spain thereby lost the protection of the French and were vulnerable to the English established in Jamaica.

== Culture ==
He was an educated and cultured man, and a man of letters. He translated the hymns of Saint Thomas Aquinas and wrote the dramas El Mejor Escudo de Perseo and Triunfos del Amor y del Poder and the comic sketch A cantar un villancico. He founded a literary academy on September 23, 1709, and promoted weekly literary discussions in the palace that attracted some of Lima's best writers. These included the famous Criollo scholar Pedro Peralta y Barnuevo. He was the patron of several Indigenous poets. He introduced French and Italian fashions in the viceroyalty and composed some musical work.

The Italian musician Rocco Cerruti (1688–1760) had arrived in Peru with the viceroy.

== Death ==
Manuel de Oms y de Santa Pau died of illness in Lima on April 24, 1710. His heart was returned to Spain, and his body was entombed in San Francisco (Lima). Miguel Núñez de Sanabria, president of the Audiencia of Lima took over governmental functions on an interim basis.

Government offices
Preceded by Miguel Núñez de Sanabria	Viceroy of Peru; 1707–1710	Succeeded by Miguel Núñez de Sanabria
