= Francisco de Borja y Aragón =

Spanish writer and official

Francisco de Borja y Aragón Count of Rebolledo Prince of Squillace
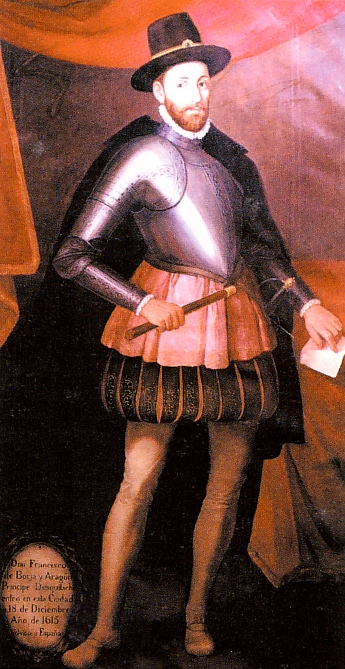

12th Viceroy of Peru
- In office December 18, 1615 – December 31, 1621
- Monarch: Philip II
- Preceded by: Juan de Mendoza
- Succeeded by: Juan Jiménez de Montalvo

Personal details
- Born: 1581 Madrid
- Died: 26 September 1658 (aged 76–77) Madrid

Francisco de Borja y Aragón, Prince of Squillace, Count of Mayalde (1581 – September 26, 1658) was a Spanish writer, official in the court of King Philip III of Spain, and, from December 18, 1615 to December 31, 1621, viceroy of Peru.

== Biography ==
Francisco de Borja y Aragón was born in Madrid, son of Juan de Borja y Castro and his second wife Francisca de Aragón Barreto. He was a descendant of King Ferdinand of Aragon and of Rodrigo Borgia (Pope Alexander VI). He was also related to Charles V, Holy Roman Emperor and Saint Francis Borgia. Born and educated in Spain, he became an important official in the Spanish court. He was knight commander of the military Order of Santiago and lord of the bedchamber to the king. He was also known as a man of letters. He was appointed viceroy of Peru in 1614, and assumed office the following year.

In Peru, he reorganized the University of San Marcos. He also founded, in Cuzco, the Colegio del Príncipe for sons of the indigenous nobility and the Colegio de San Francisco for sons of the conquistadors. He established the Tribunal del Consulado, a special court and administrative body for commercial affairs in the viceroyalty. He also strengthened the navy and the artillery and gave a great impulse to mining in the district of Chucuito, thereby increasing the revenue of the government of the colony.

In 1617 he divided the government of Río de la Plata into two, Buenos Aires and Paraguay, both dependencies of the Viceroyalty of Peru. He was a supporter of the Jesuits, and collaborated with them in the suppression of idolatry and witchcraft. A 1617 decree issued in his capacity as Viceroy, (Don Francisco de Boria Principe de Esqvilache Conde de Mayalde Gentilhombre dela Camara del Rey Nuestro Señor Su Vírrey lugar teníente, Gouernador, y Capitan General) is held by the National Library of Peru.

On the death of his patron, Philip III, Borja y Aragón returned to Spain, embarking on December 31, 1621. There he dedicated himself to poetry, reworking and publishing some of the poems of his youth and writing new works in verse and prose. He died in Madrid in 1658.

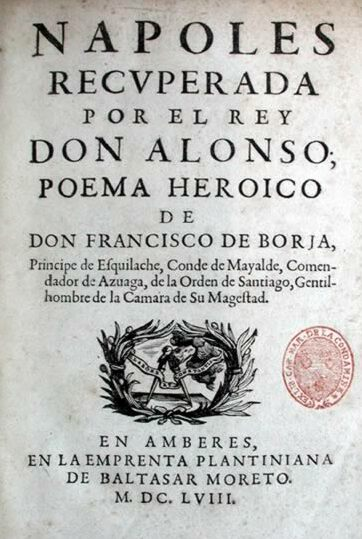
Napoles recuperada por el Rey Don Alonso poema heroico, title page, 1658 ed.

== Literary works ==
- NNapoles recuperada por el rey don Alonso (Naples Regained by King Alfonso V of Aragon). Epic poem in eight-line stanzas and 12 cantos, 1651.
- Obras en Verso (Works in Verse). Antwerp, 1654.
- Oraciones y Meditaciones de la Vida de Jesucristo (Speeches and Meditations on the Life of Jesus Christ; Brussels, 1661).

Miguel de Cervantes included an appreciation of Borja y Aragón's works in his Viaje del Parnaso. Madrid, 1614.

== Descendants ==
Francisco de Borja y Aragón married Anna Borgia d’Aragona e Pignatelli, Princess of Squillace. Anna's father was Pietro, a grandson of Francesco (son of Gioffre Borgia). They have the following children:

1. María Francisca de Borja y Aragón, married to Fernando de Borja y Aragón
2. Juan de Borja y Aragón, Count of Simari, no issue.
3. Francisca María de Borja y Aragón (March 26, 1611 – 1657), married Francisco de Castelvi, 2nd Marquis of Laconi, no issue.

== Notes ==
Government offices
Preceded by Juan de Mendoza y Luna	Viceroy of Peru; 1615–1621	Succeeded by Juan Jiménez de Montalvo
