= Juan Jiménez de Montalvo =

Spanish magistrate and politician

Doctor Juan Jiménez de Montalvo (born 1551, Olmedo, Castile) was an oidor (judge) of the Royal Audiencia of Lima, and briefly in 1621 and 1622, interim viceroy of Peru.

== Biography ==
According to his biographer Manuel Moreyra y Paz Soldán, Juan Jiménez de Montalvo was a native of Olmedo, in Old Castile. In 1598 he was designated oidor (judge) of the Royal Audiencia of Lima. On December 31, 1621, Viceroy Francisco de Borja y Aragón embarked for Spain. As the senior member of the Audiencia, Jiménez de Montalvo took the reins of government as interim viceroy.

He served as acting viceroy for seven months, until the arrival of Diego Fernández de Córdoba, Marquis of Guadalcázar. During this time he presided over the ceremonies for the proclamation of King Philip IV of Spain and the swearing of allegiance to the new monarch.

He married Mayor Bravo de Saravia y Cáceres, a native of Santiago de Chile. They had four children. One son, Juan, became president of the Council of the Indies in Spain. Another son, Diego, became a knight of the Order of Santiago. After the death of Doctor Jiménez de Montalvo, his widow remarried, to another oidor in the Audiencia of Lima, Doctor Francisco de Alfaro.

Government offices
Preceded by Francisco de Borja y Aragón	Viceroy of Peru; 1621–1622	Succeeded by Diego Fernández de Córdoba
