= List of viceroys of Peru =

Viceroy of Peru
- Residence: The Viceroy Palace (Now the Government Palace)
- Appointer: The King of Spain
- Formation: 26 July 1529
- First holder: Francisco Pizarro
- Final holder: Pío de Tristán
- Abolished: 30 December 1824

This article lists the viceroys of Peru, who ruled the Viceroyalty of Peru from 1544 to 1824 in the name of the monarch of Spain. The territories under de jure rule by the viceroys included in the 16th and 17th century nearly all of South America except eastern Brazil.

== Governors of New Castile (1532–1544) ==
| No. | Portrait | Governor | From | Until | President of the Council of Indies (Note: Depending office of the Spanish Empire colonies) | Monarch |
|---|---|---|---|---|---|---|
| 1 | | Francisco Pizarro | 26 July 1529 | 26 June 1541 | García Fernández Manrique | Charles I |
| 1 | | Francisco Pizarro | 26 July 1529 | 26 June 1541 | García de Loaysa | Charles I |
| 1 | | Francisco Pizarro | 26 July 1529 | 26 June 1541 | García Fernández Manrique | Charles I |
| — | | Diego de Almagro "El Mozo" | 26 June 1541 | 16 September 1542 | García Fernández Manrique | Charles I |
| 2 | | Cristóbal Vaca de Castro | 7 August 1542 | 17 May 1544 | García Fernández Manrique | Charles I |
| — | | Gonzalo Pizarro; Usurper and claimant to the governorship of Peru. Claims not definitively quelled until Battle of Jaquijahuana. | 7 May 1544 | 10 April 1548 | García Fernández Manrique | Charles I |
| — | | Gonzalo Pizarro; Usurper and claimant to the governorship of Peru. Claims not definitively quelled until Battle of Jaquijahuana. | 7 May 1544 | 10 April 1548 | Luis Hurtado de Mendoza | Charles I |

== Viceroys of Peru (1544–1824) ==
| No. | Portrait | Governor | From | Until | Secretary of the Indies (Note: Depending secretariat of the Spanish Empire colonies) | Valido Secretary of the Universal Bureau First Secretary of State | Regent | Monarch |
|---|---|---|---|---|---|---|---|---|
| 1 | | Blasco Núñez Vela | 15 May 1544 | 18 January 1546 | Vacant (Overseas Affairs hold by the President of the Council of the Indies) | No valido | No regency | Charles I |
| Int. | | Pedro de la Gasca, Dean of the Audiencia | 10 April 1547 | 27 January 1550 | Vacant (Overseas Affairs hold by the President of the Council of the Indies) | No valido | No regency | Charles I |
| 2 | | Antonio de Mendoza, Marquis of Mondéjar, Count of Tendilla | 23 September 1551 | 21 July 1552 | Vacant (Overseas Affairs hold by the President of the Council of the Indies) | No valido | No regency | Charles I |
| Int. | | Melchor Bravo de Saravia, Dean of the Audiencia | 21 July 1552 | 29 June 1556 | Vacant (Overseas Affairs hold by the President of the Council of the Indies) | No valido | No regency | Charles I |
| Int. | | Melchor Bravo de Saravia, Dean of the Audiencia | 21 July 1552 | 29 June 1556 | Vacant (Overseas Affairs hold by the President of the Council of the Indies) | No valido | No regency | Philip II |
| 3 | | Andrés Hurtado de Mendoza, 3rd Marquis of Cañete | 29 June 1556 | 30 March 1561 | Vacant (Overseas Affairs hold by the President of the Council of the Indies) | No valido | No regency | Philip II |
| 4 | | Diego López de Zúñiga, 4th Count of Nieva | 17 April 1561 | 20 February 1564 | Vacant (Overseas Affairs hold by the President of the Council of the Indies) | No valido | No regency | Philip II |
| Int. | | Juan de Saavedra, Dean of the Audiencia | 20 February 1564 | 2 September 1564 | Vacant (Overseas Affairs hold by the President of the Council of the Indies) | No valido | No regency | Philip II |
| Int. | | Lope García de Castro, Dean of the Audiencia | 2 September 1564 | 26 November 1569 | Vacant (Overseas Affairs hold by the President of the Council of the Indies) | No valido | No regency | Philip II |
| 5 | | Francisco Álvarez de Toledo | 26 November 1569 | 23 September 1581 | Vacant (Overseas Affairs hold by the President of the Council of the Indies) | No valido | No regency | Philip II |
| 6 | | Martín Enríquez de Almanza | 23 September 1581 | 13 March 1583 | Vacant (Overseas Affairs hold by the President of the Council of the Indies) | No valido | No regency | Philip II |
| Int. | | Cristóbal Ramírez de Cartagena, Dean of the Audiencia | 13 March 1583 | 31 March 1584 | Vacant (Overseas Affairs hold by the President of the Council of the Indies) | No valido | No regency | Philip II |
| 7 | | Fernando Torres de Portugal y Mesía, 1st Count of Villadompardo | 31 March 1584 | 20 November 1589 | Vacant (Overseas Affairs hold by the President of the Council of the Indies) | No valido | No regency | Philip II |
| 8 | | García Hurtado de Mendoza, 5th Marquis of Cañete | 8 January 1590 | 24 July 1596 | Vacant (Overseas Affairs hold by the President of the Council of the Indies) | No valido | No regency | Philip II |
| 9 | | Luis de Velasco, Marquis of Salinas | 24 July 1596 | 18 January 1604 | Vacant (Overseas Affairs hold by the President of the Council of the Indies) | No valido | No regency | Philip II |
| 9 | | Luis de Velasco, Marquis of Salinas | 24 July 1596 | 18 January 1604 | Vacant (Overseas Affairs hold by the President of the Council of the Indies) | Duke of Lerma (Note: As valido of the King of Spain) | No regency | Philip III |
| 10 | | Gaspar de Zúñiga, 5th Count of Monterrey | 18 January 1604 | 16 March 1606 | Vacant (Overseas Affairs hold by the President of the Council of the Indies) | Duke of Lerma | No regency | Philip III |
| Int. | | Diego Núñez de Avendaño, Dean of the Audiencia | 16 March 1606 | 21 December 1607 | Vacant (Overseas Affairs hold by the President of the Council of the Indies) | Duke of Lerma | No regency | Philip III |
| 11 | | Juan de Mendoza, 3rd Marquis of Montesclaros | 21 December 1607 | 18 December 1615 | Vacant (Overseas Affairs hold by the President of the Council of the Indies) | Duke of Lerma | No regency | Philip III |
| 12 | | Francisco de Borja y Aragón, Count of Rebolledo, Prince of Esquilache | 18 December 1615 | 31 December 1621 | Vacant (Overseas Affairs hold by the President of the Council of the Indies) | Duke of Lerma | No regency | Philip III |
| 12 | | Francisco de Borja y Aragón, Count of Rebolledo, Prince of Esquilache | 18 December 1615 | 31 December 1621 | Vacant (Overseas Affairs hold by the President of the Council of the Indies) | Cristóbal Gómez de Sandoval | No regency | Philip III |
| 12 | | Francisco de Borja y Aragón, Count of Rebolledo, Prince of Esquilache | 18 December 1615 | 31 December 1621 | Vacant (Overseas Affairs hold by the President of the Council of the Indies) | Baltasar de Zúñiga | No regency | Philip IV |
| Int. | | Juan Jiménez de Montalvo, Dean of the Audiencia | 31 December 1621 | 25 July 1622 | Vacant (Overseas Affairs hold by the President of the Council of the Indies) | Baltasar de Zúñiga | No regency | Philip IV |
| 13 | | Diego Fernández de Córdoba, Marquis of Guadalcázar, Count of Posadas | 25 July 1622 | 14 January 1629 | Vacant (Overseas Affairs hold by the President of the Council of the Indies) | Baltasar de Zúñiga | No regency | Philip IV |
| 13 | | Diego Fernández de Córdoba, Marquis of Guadalcázar, Count of Posadas | 25 July 1622 | 14 January 1629 | Vacant (Overseas Affairs hold by the President of the Council of the Indies) | Count-Duke of Olivares | No regency | Philip IV |
| 14 | | Luis Jerónimo de Cabrera, 4th Count of Chinchón | 14 January 1629 | 18 December 1639 | Vacant (Overseas Affairs hold by the President of the Council of the Indies) | Count-Duke of Olivares | No regency | Philip IV |
| 15 | | Pedro de Toledo, 1st Marquis of Mancera | 18 December 1639 | 20 September 1648 | Vacant (Overseas Affairs hold by the President of the Council of the Indies) | Count-Duke of Olivares | No regency | Philip IV |
| 15 | | Pedro de Toledo, 1st Marquis of Mancera | 18 December 1639 | 20 September 1648 | Vacant (Overseas Affairs hold by the President of the Council of the Indies) | Luis de Haro | No regency | Philip IV |
| 16 | | García Sarmiento de Sotomayor, 2nd Count of Salvatierra | 20 September 1648 | 24 February 1655 | Vacant (Overseas Affairs hold by the President of the Council of the Indies) | Luis de Haro | No regency | Philip IV |
| 17 | | Luis Enríquez de Guzmán, 9th Count of Alba de Liste | 24 February 1655 | 31 December 1661 | Vacant (Overseas Affairs hold by the President of the Council of the Indies) | Luis de Haro | No regency | Philip IV |
| 17 | | Luis Enríquez de Guzmán, 9th Count of Alba de Liste | 24 February 1655 | 31 December 1661 | Vacant (Overseas Affairs hold by the President of the Council of the Indies) | No valido (Note: Personalist government of Philip IV) | No regency | Philip IV |
| 18 | | Diego de Benavides, 8th Count of Santisteban del Puerto, 1st Marquis of Solera | 31 December 1661 | 16 March 1666 | Vacant (Overseas Affairs hold by the President of the Council of the Indies) | No valido | No regency | Philip IV |
| 18 | | Diego de Benavides, 8th Count of Santisteban del Puerto, 1st Marquis of Solera | 31 December 1661 | 16 March 1666 | Vacant (Overseas Affairs hold by the President of the Council of the Indies) | Juan Everardo Nithard | Mariana of Austria (Note: As regent during the minority of his son, Charles II) | Charles II |
| Int. | | Bernardo de Iturriaza, Dean of the Audiencia | 17 March 1666 | 21 November 1667 | Vacant (Overseas Affairs hold by the President of the Council of the Indies) | Juan Everardo Nithard | Mariana of Austria | Charles II |
| 19 | | Pedro Antonio Fernández de Castro, 10th Count of Lemos | 21 November 1667 | 6 December 1672 | Vacant (Overseas Affairs hold by the President of the Council of the Indies) | Juan Everardo Nithard | Mariana of Austria | Charles II |
| 19 | | Pedro Antonio Fernández de Castro, 10th Count of Lemos | 21 November 1667 | 6 December 1672 | Vacant (Overseas Affairs hold by the President of the Council of the Indies) | Fernando de Valenzuela | Mariana of Austria | Charles II |
| Int. | | Bernardo de Iturriaza, Dean of the Audiencia | 6 December 1672 | 15 August 1674 | Vacant (Overseas Affairs hold by the President of the Council of the Indies) | Fernando de Valenzuela | Mariana of Austria | Charles II |
| 20 | | Baltasar de la Cueva, Count of Castellar | 15 August 1674 | 7 July 1678 | Vacant (Overseas Affairs hold by the President of the Council of the Indies) | Fernando de Valenzuela | Mariana of Austria | Charles II |
| 20 | | Baltasar de la Cueva, Count of Castellar | 15 August 1674 | 7 July 1678 | Vacant (Overseas Affairs hold by the President of the Council of the Indies) | Fernando de Valenzuela | No regency | Charles II |
| 20 | | Baltasar de la Cueva, Count of Castellar | 15 August 1674 | 7 July 1678 | Vacant (Overseas Affairs hold by the President of the Council of the Indies) | John Joseph of Austria (Note: As Chief Minister of Spain) | No regency | Charles II |
| 21 | | Melchor Liñán y Cisneros (Archbishop of Lima) | 7 July 1678 | 20 November 1681 | Vacant (Overseas Affairs hold by the President of the Council of the Indies) | John Joseph of Austria | No regency | Charles II |
| 21 | | Melchor Liñán y Cisneros (Archbishop of Lima) | 7 July 1678 | 20 November 1681 | Vacant (Overseas Affairs hold by the President of the Council of the Indies) | Duke of Medinaceli | No regency | Charles II |
| 22 | | Melchor de Navarra, Duke of Palata | 20 November 1681 | 15 August 1689 | Vacant (Overseas Affairs hold by the President of the Council of the Indies) | Duke of Medinaceli | No regency | Charles II |
| 22 | | Melchor de Navarra, Duke of Palata | 20 November 1681 | 15 August 1689 | Vacant (Overseas Affairs hold by the President of the Council of the Indies) | Count of Oropesa | No regency | Charles II |
| 23 | | Melchor Portocarrero, 3rd Count of Monclova | 15 August 1689 | 22 September 1705 | Vacant (Overseas Affairs hold by the President of the Council of the Indies) | Count of Oropesa | No regency | Charles II |
| 23 | | Melchor Portocarrero, 3rd Count of Monclova | 15 August 1689 | 22 September 1705 | Vacant (Overseas Affairs hold by the President of the Council of the Indies) | Cardinal Portocarrero | No regency | Charles II |
| 23 | | Melchor Portocarrero, 3rd Count of Monclova | 15 August 1689 | 22 September 1705 | Vacant (Overseas Affairs hold by the President of the Council of the Indies) | Count of Oropesa | No regency | Charles II |
| 23 | | Melchor Portocarrero, 3rd Count of Monclova | 15 August 1689 | 22 September 1705 | Vacant (Overseas Affairs hold by the President of the Council of the Indies) | Cardinal Portocarrero | No regency | Charles II |
| 23 | | Melchor Portocarrero, 3rd Count of Monclova | 15 August 1689 | 22 September 1705 | Vacant (Overseas Affairs hold by the President of the Council of the Indies) | Cardinal Portocarrero | Cardinal Portocarrero (Note: During the illness of Charles II) | Charles II |
| 23 | | Melchor Portocarrero, 3rd Count of Monclova | 15 August 1689 | 22 September 1705 | Vacant (Overseas Affairs hold by the President of the Council of the Indies) | Antonio de Ubilla (Note: As Secretary of the Universal Bureau) | Government Board of the Realms (Note: After the death of Charles II) | Vacant (Note: Until the coronation of Philip of Anjou) |
| 23 | | Melchor Portocarrero, 3rd Count of Monclova | 15 August 1689 | 22 September 1705 | Vacant (Overseas Affairs hold by the President of the Council of the Indies) | Antonio de Ubilla | Government Board of the Realms | Philip V |
| 23 | | Melchor Portocarrero, 3rd Count of Monclova | 15 August 1689 | 22 September 1705 | Vacant (Overseas Affairs hold by the President of the Council of the Indies) | Marquis of Mejorada del Campo | Cardinal Portocarrero (Note: During the voyage of Philip V) | Philip V |
| 23 | | Melchor Portocarrero, 3rd Count of Monclova | 15 August 1689 | 22 September 1705 | Vacant (Overseas Affairs hold by the President of the Council of the Indies) | Marquis of Mejorada del Campo | No regency | Philip V |
| Int. | | Juan Peñalosa y Benavides, Dean of the Audiencia | 22 September 1705 | 7 July 1707 | Vacant (Overseas Affairs hold by the President of the Council of the Indies) | Marquis of Mejorada del Campo | No regency | Philip V |
| 24 | | Manuel de Oms, 1st Marquis of Castelldosrius | 7 July 1707 | 22 April 1710 | Vacant (Overseas Affairs hold by the President of the Council of the Indies) | Marquis of Mejorada del Campo | No regency | Philip V |
| Int. | | Miguel Núñez de Sanabria, Dean of the Audiencia | 22 April 1710 | 14 September 1710 | Vacant (Overseas Affairs hold by the President of the Council of the Indies) | Marquis of Mejorada del Campo | No regency | Philip V |
| 25 | | Diego Ladrón de Guevara | 14 September 1710 | 2 March 1716 | Vacant (Overseas Affairs hold by the President of the Council of the Indies) | Marquis of Mejorada del Campo | No regency | Philip V |
| 25 | | Diego Ladrón de Guevara | 14 September 1710 | 2 March 1716 | Vacant (Overseas Affairs hold by the President of the Council of the Indies) | Manuel de Vadillo y Velasco | No regency | Philip V |
| 25 | | Diego Ladrón de Guevara | 14 September 1710 | 2 March 1716 | Vacant (Overseas Affairs hold by the President of the Council of the Indies) | José de Grimaldo | No regency | Philip V |
| 25 | | Diego Ladrón de Guevara | 14 September 1710 | 2 March 1716 | Bernardo Tinajero de la Escalera (Note: As Secretary of State for the Navy and the Indies) | José de Grimaldo | No regency | Philip V |
| 25 | | Diego Ladrón de Guevara | 14 September 1710 | 2 March 1716 | No secretary | José de Grimaldo | No regency | Philip V |
| Int. | | Mateo de la Mata Ponce de León, Dean of the Audiencia | 2 March 1716 | 15 August 1716 | No secretary | José de Grimaldo | No regency | Philip V |
| Int. | | Diego Morcillo Rubio de Auñón, O.SS.T. (Archbishop of Lima) | 15 August 1716 | 5 October 1716 | No secretary | José de Grimaldo | No regency | Philip V |
| 26 | | Carmine Caracciolo, 5th Prince of Santo Buono | 5 October 1716 | 26 January 1720 | No secretary | José de Grimaldo | No regency | Philip V |
| 27 | | Diego Morcillo Rubio de Auñón, O.SS.T. (Archbishop of Lima) | 26 January 1720 | 14 May 1724 | No secretary | José de Grimaldo | No regency | Philip V |
| 27 | | Diego Morcillo Rubio de Auñón, O.SS.T. (Archbishop of Lima) | 26 January 1720 | 14 May 1724 | Miguel Fernández Durán | José de Grimaldo | No regency | Philip V |
| 27 | | Diego Morcillo Rubio de Auñón, O.SS.T. (Archbishop of Lima) | 26 January 1720 | 14 May 1724 | Andres Matías de Pes Marazaraga | José de Grimaldo | No regency | Philip V |
| 27 | | Diego Morcillo Rubio de Auñón, O.SS.T. (Archbishop of Lima) | 26 January 1720 | 14 May 1724 | No secretary | José de Grimaldo | No regency | Philip V |
| 27 | | Diego Morcillo Rubio de Auñón, O.SS.T. (Archbishop of Lima) | 26 January 1720 | 14 May 1724 | Antonio de Sopeña y Mioño | José de Grimaldo | No regency | Philip V |
| 27 | | Diego Morcillo Rubio de Auñón, O.SS.T. (Archbishop of Lima) | 26 January 1720 | 14 May 1724 | Antonio de Sopeña y Mioño | Juan Bautista de Orendáin | No regency | Philip V |
| 27 | | Diego Morcillo Rubio de Auñón, O.SS.T. (Archbishop of Lima) | 26 January 1720 | 14 May 1724 | Antonio de Sopeña y Mioño | Juan Bautista de Orendáin | No regency | Louis I From 1700 to 1724, Philip V was the king; then from 1724 to 1746. Louis I only reigned in 1724. |
| 28 | | José de Armendáriz, 1st Marquis of Castelfuerte | 14 May 1724 | 4 February 1736 | Antonio de Sopeña y Mioño | Juan Bautista de Orendáin | No regency | Louis I From 1700 to 1724, Philip V was the king; then from 1724 to 1746. Louis I only reigned in 1724. |
| 28 | | José de Armendáriz, 1st Marquis of Castelfuerte | 14 May 1724 | 4 February 1736 | Antonio de Sopeña y Mioño | Juan Bautista de Orendáin | No regency | Philip V |
| 28 | | José de Armendáriz, 1st Marquis of Castelfuerte | 14 May 1724 | 4 February 1736 | Antonio de Sopeña y Mioño | José de Grimaldo | No regency | Philip V |
| 28 | | José de Armendáriz, 1st Marquis of Castelfuerte | 14 May 1724 | 4 February 1736 | José de Patiño y Rosales | José de Grimaldo | No regency | Philip V |
| 28 | | José de Armendáriz, 1st Marquis of Castelfuerte | 14 May 1724 | 4 February 1736 | José de Patiño y Rosales | Baron Ripperda | No regency | Philip V |
| 28 | | José de Armendáriz, 1st Marquis of Castelfuerte | 14 May 1724 | 4 February 1736 | José de Patiño y Rosales | José de Grimaldo | No regency | Philip V |
| 28 | | José de Armendáriz, 1st Marquis of Castelfuerte | 14 May 1724 | 4 February 1736 | José de Patiño y Rosales | Juan Bautista de Orendáin | No regency | Philip V |
| 28 | | José de Armendáriz, 1st Marquis of Castelfuerte | 14 May 1724 | 4 February 1736 | José de Patiño y Rosales | José de Patiño y Rosales (Note: As First Secretary of State) | No regency | Philip V |
| 29 | | José Antonio de Mendoza, 3rd Marquis of Villagarcía | 4 February 1736 | 15 December 1745 | José de Patiño y Rosales | José de Patiño y Rosales | No regency | Philip V |
| 29 | | José Antonio de Mendoza, 3rd Marquis of Villagarcía | 4 February 1736 | 15 December 1745 | Mateo Pablo Díaz de Lavandero | Marquis of Villarías | No regency | Philip V |
| 29 | | José Antonio de Mendoza, 3rd Marquis of Villagarcía | 4 February 1736 | 15 December 1745 | Marquis of Villarías | Marquis of Villarías | No regency | Philip V |
| 29 | | José Antonio de Mendoza, 3rd Marquis of Villagarcía | 4 February 1736 | 15 December 1745 | Marquess of Ensenada | Marquis of Villarías | No regency | Philip V |
| 30 | | José Manso de Velasco, 1st Count of Superunda | 15 December 1745 | 12 October 1761 | Marquess of Ensenada | Marquis of Villarías | No regency | Philip V |
| 30 | | José Manso de Velasco, 1st Count of Superunda | 15 December 1745 | 12 October 1761 | Marquess of Ensenada | Marquis of Villarías | No regency | Ferdinand VI |
| 30 | | José Manso de Velasco, 1st Count of Superunda | 15 December 1745 | 12 October 1761 | Marquess of Ensenada | José de Carvajal | No regency | Ferdinand VI |
| 30 | | José Manso de Velasco, 1st Count of Superunda | 15 December 1745 | 12 October 1761 | Marquess of Ensenada | Duke of Huéscar (Interim) | No regency | Ferdinand VI |
| 30 | | José Manso de Velasco, 1st Count of Superunda | 15 December 1745 | 12 October 1761 | Marquess of Ensenada | Ricardo Wall | No regency | Ferdinand VI |
| 30 | | José Manso de Velasco, 1st Count of Superunda | 15 December 1745 | 12 October 1761 | Ricardo Wall (Interim) (Note: As Secretary of State for Indies) | Ricardo Wall | No regency | Ferdinand VI |
| 30 | | José Manso de Velasco, 1st Count of Superunda | 15 December 1745 | 12 October 1761 | Julián de Arriaga y Ribera | Ricardo Wall | No regency | Ferdinand VI |
| 30 | | José Manso de Velasco, 1st Count of Superunda | 15 December 1745 | 12 October 1761 | Julián de Arriaga y Ribera | Ricardo Wall | Elisabeth Farnese (Note: Until the arrival of Charles III) | Charles III |
| 30 | | José Manso de Velasco, 1st Count of Superunda | 15 December 1745 | 12 October 1761 | Julián de Arriaga y Ribera | Ricardo Wall | No regency | Charles III |
| 31 | | Manuel de Amat y Juniet | 12 October 1761 | 17 July 1776 | Julián de Arriaga y Ribera | Ricardo Wall | No regency | Charles III |
| 31 | | Manuel de Amat y Juniet | 12 October 1761 | 17 July 1776 | Julián de Arriaga y Ribera | Jerónimo Grimaldi | No regency | Charles III |
| 31 | | Manuel de Amat y Juniet | 12 October 1761 | 17 July 1776 | Marquess of Sonora | Jerónimo Grimaldi | No regency | Charles III |
| 32 | | Manuel de Guirior | 17 July 1776 | 21 July 1780 | Marquess of Sonora | Jerónimo Grimaldi | No regency | Charles III |
| 32 | | Manuel de Guirior | 17 July 1776 | 21 July 1780 | Marquess of Sonora | Count of Floridablanca | No regency | Charles III |
| 33 | | Agustín de Jáuregui | 21 July 1780 | 29 April 1784 | Marquess of Sonora | Count of Floridablanca | No regency | Charles III |
| 34 | | Teodoro de Croix | 29 April 1784 | 25 March 1790 | Marquess of Sonora | Count of Floridablanca | No regency | Charles III |
| 34 | | Teodoro de Croix | 29 April 1784 | 25 March 1790 | Count of Floridablanca (Interim) | Count of Floridablanca | No regency | Charles IV |
| 34 | | Teodoro de Croix | 29 April 1784 | 25 March 1790 | Antonio Porlier (Note: As Secretary of State for Grace and Justice of Indies) Antonio Valdés y Fernández Bazán (Note: As Secretary of State for War, Treasury, Commerce and Navigation of Indies) | Count of Floridablanca | No regency | Charles IV |
| 35 | | Francisco Gil de Taboada | 25 March 1790 | 6 June 1796 | Antonio Porlier Antonio Valdés y Fernández Bazán | Count of Floridablanca | No regency | Charles IV |
| 35 | | Francisco Gil de Taboada | 25 March 1790 | 6 June 1796 | No secretary (affairs of Indies distributed among different secretariats) | Count of Aranda (Interim) | No regency | Charles IV |
| 35 | | Francisco Gil de Taboada | 25 March 1790 | 6 June 1796 | No secretary (affairs of Indies distributed among different secretariats) | Manuel Godoy | No regency | Charles IV |
| 36 | | Ambrosio O'Higgins, 1st Marquis of Osorno | 24 July 1796 | 19 March 1801 | No secretary (affairs of Indies distributed among different secretariats) | Manuel Godoy | No regency | Charles IV |
| 36 | | Ambrosio O'Higgins, 1st Marquis of Osorno | 24 July 1796 | 19 March 1801 | No secretary (affairs of Indies distributed among different secretariats) | Francisco Saavedra | No regency | Charles IV |
| 36 | | Ambrosio O'Higgins, 1st Marquis of Osorno | 24 July 1796 | 19 March 1801 | No secretary (affairs of Indies distributed among different secretariats) | Mariano Luis de Urquijo | No regency | Charles IV |
| 36 | | Ambrosio O'Higgins, 1st Marquis of Osorno | 24 July 1796 | 19 March 1801 | No secretary (affairs of Indies distributed among different secretariats) | Pedro Cevallos Guerra | No regency | Charles IV |
| Int. | | Manuel Arredondo y Pelegrín, Dean of the Audiencia | 19 March 1801 | 5 November 1801 | No secretary (affairs of Indies distributed among different secretariats) | Pedro Cevallos Guerra | No regency | Charles IV |
| 37 | | Gabriel de Avilés, 2nd Marquis of Avilés | 5 November 1801 | 20 August 1806 | No secretary (affairs of Indies distributed among different secretariats) | Pedro Cevallos Guerra | No regency | Charles IV |
| 38 | | José Fernando de Abascal y Sousa, 1st Marquis of La Concordia (Note: Loyal to Ferdinand VII instead of Joseph Bonaparte during the Spanish War of Independence) | 20 August 1806 | 7 July 1816 | No secretary (affairs of Indies distributed among different secretariats) | Pedro Cevallos Guerra | No regency | Charles IV |
| 38 | | José Fernando de Abascal y Sousa, 1st Marquis of La Concordia | 20 August 1806 | 7 July 1816 | No secretary (affairs of Indies distributed among different secretariats) | Gonzalo O'Farril | No regency | Charles IV |
| 38 | | José Fernando de Abascal y Sousa, 1st Marquis of La Concordia | 20 August 1806 | 7 July 1816 | No secretary (affairs of Indies distributed among different secretariats) | Pedro Cevallos Guerra | No regency | Ferdinand VII |
| 38 | | José Fernando de Abascal y Sousa, 1st Marquis of La Concordia | 20 August 1806 | 7 July 1816 | No secretary (affairs of Indies distributed among different secretariats) | Martín Garay Perales (Interim) | No regency | Ferdinand VII |
| 38 | | José Fernando de Abascal y Sousa, 1st Marquis of La Concordia | 20 August 1806 | 7 July 1816 | No secretary (affairs of Indies distributed among different secretariats) | Eusebio Bardají y Azara | No regency | Ferdinand VII |
| 38 | | José Fernando de Abascal y Sousa, 1st Marquis of La Concordia | 20 August 1806 | 7 July 1816 | No secretary (affairs of Indies distributed among different secretariats) | Pedro Rivero (Interim) | No regency | Ferdinand VII |
| 38 | | José Fernando de Abascal y Sousa, 1st Marquis of La Concordia | 20 August 1806 | 7 July 1816 | No secretary (affairs of Indies distributed among different secretariats) | Francisco Saavedra | No regency | Ferdinand VII |
| 38 | | José Fernando de Abascal y Sousa, 1st Marquis of La Concordia | 20 August 1806 | 7 July 1816 | No secretary (affairs of Indies distributed among different secretariats) | Nicolás Ambrosio Garro y Arizcun (Interim) | No regency | Ferdinand VII |
| 38 | | José Fernando de Abascal y Sousa, 1st Marquis of La Concordia | 20 August 1806 | 7 July 1816 | No secretary (affairs of Indies distributed among different secretariats) | José García de León y Pizarro(Interim) | No regency | Ferdinand VII |
| 38 | | José Fernando de Abascal y Sousa, 1st Marquis of La Concordia | 20 August 1806 | 7 July 1816 | No secretary (affairs of Indies distributed among different secretariats) | Ignacio de la Pezuela (Interim) | No regency | Ferdinand VII |
| 38 | | José Fernando de Abascal y Sousa, 1st Marquis of La Concordia | 20 August 1806 | 7 July 1816 | Ciriaco González Carvajal (Interim) (Note: As Secretary of State for Overseas Governance) | Carlos Martínez de Irujo | No regency | Ferdinand VII |
| 38 | | José Fernando de Abascal y Sousa, 1st Marquis of La Concordia | 20 August 1806 | 7 July 1816 | Ciriaco González Carvajal (Interim) | Pedro Gómez Labrador | No regency | Ferdinand VII |
| 38 | | José Fernando de Abascal y Sousa, 1st Marquis of La Concordia | 20 August 1806 | 7 July 1816 | José Limonta (Interim) | Pedro Gómez Labrador | No regency | Ferdinand VII |
| 38 | | José Fernando de Abascal y Sousa, 1st Marquis of La Concordia | 20 August 1806 | 7 July 1816 | José Limonta (Interim) | Antonio Cano Ramírez de Arellano (Interim) | No regency | Ferdinand VII |
| 38 | | José Fernando de Abascal y Sousa, 1st Marquis of La Concordia | 20 August 1806 | 7 July 1816 | Manuel Antonio de la Bodega y Mollinedo | Antonio Cano Ramírez de Arellano (Interim) | No regency | Ferdinand VII |
| 38 | | José Fernando de Abascal y Sousa, 1st Marquis of La Concordia | 20 August 1806 | 7 July 1816 | Manuel Antonio de la Bodega y Mollinedo | Juan O'Donojú (Interim) | No regency | Ferdinand VII |
| 38 | | José Fernando de Abascal y Sousa, 1st Marquis of La Concordia | 20 August 1806 | 7 July 1816 | Miguel de Lardizabal | José Miguel de Carvajal-Vargas | No regency | Ferdinand VII |
| 38 | | José Fernando de Abascal y Sousa, 1st Marquis of La Concordia | 20 August 1806 | 7 July 1816 | No secretary | José Miguel de Carvajal-Vargas | No regency | Ferdinand VII |
| 38 | | José Fernando de Abascal y Sousa, 1st Marquis of La Concordia | 20 August 1806 | 7 July 1816 | No secretary | Pedro Cevallos Guerra | No regency | Ferdinand VII |
| 38 | | José Fernando de Abascal y Sousa, 1st Marquis of La Concordia | 20 August 1806 | 7 July 1816 | No secretary | Juan Estebán Lozano de Torres | No regency | Ferdinand VII |
| 38 | | José Fernando de Abascal y Sousa, 1st Marquis of La Concordia | 20 August 1806 | 7 July 1816 | No secretary | Pedro Cevallos Guerra | No regency | Ferdinand VII |
| 39 | | Joaquín de la Pezuela, 1st Marquis of Viluma | 7 July 1816 | 29 January 1821 | No secretary | Pedro Cevallos Guerra | No regency | Ferdinand VII |
| 39 | | Joaquín de la Pezuela, 1st Marquis of Viluma | 7 July 1816 | 29 January 1821 | No secretary | José García de León | No regency | Ferdinand VII |
| 39 | | Joaquín de la Pezuela, 1st Marquis of Viluma | 7 July 1816 | 29 January 1821 | No secretary | Carlos Martínez de Irujo (Interim) | No regency | Ferdinand VII |
| 39 | | Joaquín de la Pezuela, 1st Marquis of Viluma | 7 July 1816 | 29 January 1821 | No secretary | Manuel González Salmón (Interim) | No regency | Ferdinand VII |
| 39 | | Joaquín de la Pezuela, 1st Marquis of Viluma | 7 July 1816 | 29 January 1821 | No secretary | Joaquín José Melgarejo | No regency | Ferdinand VII |
| 39 | | Joaquín de la Pezuela, 1st Marquis of Viluma | 7 July 1816 | 29 January 1821 | Antonio González Salmón (Interim) | Joaquín José Melgarejo | No regency | Ferdinand VII |
| 39 | | Joaquín de la Pezuela, 1st Marquis of Viluma | 7 July 1816 | 29 January 1821 | Antonio González Salmón (Interim) | Juan Jabat Aztal | No regency | Ferdinand VII |
| 39 | | Joaquín de la Pezuela, 1st Marquis of Viluma | 7 July 1816 | 29 January 1821 | Antonio Porcel Román | Juan Jabat Aztal | No regency | Ferdinand VII |
| 39 | | Joaquín de la Pezuela, 1st Marquis of Viluma | 7 July 1816 | 29 January 1821 | Antonio Porcel Román | Evaristo Pérez de Castro | No regency | Ferdinand VII |
| 39 | | Joaquín de la Pezuela, 1st Marquis of Viluma | 7 July 1816 | 29 January 1821 | Ramón Gil de la Cuadra | Evaristo Pérez de Castro | No regency | Ferdinand VII |
| 40 | | José de la Serna e Hinojosa, 1st Count of los Andes | 29 January 1821 | 9 December 1824 | Ramón Gil de la Cuadra | Evaristo Pérez de Castro | No regency | Ferdinand VII |
| 40 | | José de la Serna e Hinojosa, 1st Count of los Andes | 29 January 1821 | 9 December 1824 | Antonio de Guilleman (Interim) | Joaquín Anduaga Cuenca (Interim) | No regency | Ferdinand VII |
| 40 | | José de la Serna e Hinojosa, 1st Count of los Andes | 29 January 1821 | 9 December 1824 | Antonio de Guilleman (Interim) | Francisco de Paula Escudero (Interim) | No regency | Ferdinand VII |
| 40 | | José de la Serna e Hinojosa, 1st Count of los Andes | 29 January 1821 | 9 December 1824 | Ramón Olaguer Feliú | Francisco de Paula Escudero (Interim) | No regency | Ferdinand VII |
| 40 | | José de la Serna e Hinojosa, 1st Count of los Andes | 29 January 1821 | 9 December 1824 | Ramón Olaguer Feliú | Eusebio Bardají y Azara | No regency | Ferdinand VII |
| 40 | | José de la Serna e Hinojosa, 1st Count of los Andes | 29 January 1821 | 9 December 1824 | Ramón López Pelegrín | Eusebio Bardají y Azara | No regency | Ferdinand VII |
| 40 | | José de la Serna e Hinojosa, 1st Count of los Andes | 29 January 1821 | 9 December 1824 | Ramón López Pelegrín | Ramón López Pelegrín | No regency | Ferdinand VII |
| 40 | | José de la Serna e Hinojosa, 1st Count of los Andes | 29 January 1821 | 9 December 1824 | Ramón López Pelegrín | José Gabriel de Silva y Bazán | No regency | Ferdinand VII |
| 40 | | José de la Serna e Hinojosa, 1st Count of los Andes | 29 January 1821 | 9 December 1824 | Ramón López Pelegrín | Ramón López Pelegrín | No regency | Ferdinand VII |
| 40 | | José de la Serna e Hinojosa, 1st Count of los Andes | 29 January 1821 | 9 December 1824 | Manuel de la Bodega Mollinedo | Francisco Martínez de la Rosa | No regency | Ferdinand VII |
| 40 | | José de la Serna e Hinojosa, 1st Count of los Andes | 29 January 1821 | 9 December 1824 | Diego Clemencín | Francisco Martínez de la Rosa | No regency | Ferdinand VII |
| 40 | | José de la Serna e Hinojosa, 1st Count of los Andes | 29 January 1821 | 9 December 1824 | José Manuel de Vadillo | Francisco Martínez de la Rosa | No regency | Ferdinand VII |
| 40 | | José de la Serna e Hinojosa, 1st Count of los Andes | 29 January 1821 | 9 December 1824 | José Manuel de Vadillo | Evaristo Fernández San Miguel y Valledor | No regency | Ferdinand VII |
| 40 | | José de la Serna e Hinojosa, 1st Count of los Andes | 29 January 1821 | 9 December 1824 | José Manuel de Vadillo | José Manuel Vadillo | No regency | Ferdinand VII |
| 40 | | José de la Serna e Hinojosa, 1st Count of los Andes | 29 January 1821 | 9 December 1824 | Pedro Urquinaona | Santiago Usoz y Mozi | No regency | Ferdinand VII |
| 40 | | José de la Serna e Hinojosa, 1st Count of los Andes | 29 January 1821 | 9 December 1824 | Pedro Urquinaona | José María Pando de la Riva y Ramírez de Laredo | No regency | Ferdinand VII |
| 40 | | José de la Serna e Hinojosa, 1st Count of los Andes | 29 January 1821 | 9 December 1824 | Francisco de Paula Ossorio y Vargas (Interim) | José María Pando de la Riva y Ramírez de Laredo | No regency | Ferdinand VII |
| 40 | | José de la Serna e Hinojosa, 1st Count of los Andes | 29 January 1821 | 9 December 1824 | Francisco de Paula Ossorio y Vargas (Interim) | Luis María de Salazar y Salazar | No regency | Ferdinand VII |
| 40 | | José de la Serna e Hinojosa, 1st Count of los Andes | 29 January 1821 | 9 December 1824 | Francisco de Paula Ossorio y Vargas (Interim) | Juan Antonio Yandiola Garay | No regency | Ferdinand VII |
| 40 | | José de la Serna e Hinojosa, 1st Count of los Andes | 29 January 1821 | 9 December 1824 | Francisco de Paula Ossorio y Vargas (Interim) | José Luyando | No regency | Ferdinand VII |
| 40 | | José de la Serna e Hinojosa, 1st Count of los Andes | 29 January 1821 | 9 December 1824 | No secretary | José Luyando | No regency | Ferdinand VII |
| 40 | | José de la Serna e Hinojosa, 1st Count of los Andes | 29 January 1821 | 9 December 1824 | No secretary | Víctor Damián Sáez | No regency | Ferdinand VII |
| 40 | | José de la Serna e Hinojosa, 1st Count of los Andes | 29 January 1821 | 9 December 1824 | No secretary | Carlos Martínez de Irujo | No regency | Ferdinand VII |
| 40 | | José de la Serna e Hinojosa, 1st Count of los Andes | 29 January 1821 | 9 December 1824 | No secretary | Narciso Heredia | No regency | Ferdinand VII |
| 40 | | José de la Serna e Hinojosa, 1st Count of los Andes | 29 January 1821 | 9 December 1824 | No secretary | Francisco Cea Bermúdez | No regency | Ferdinand VII |
| 41 | | Juan Pío de Tristán y Moscoso | 9 December 1824 | 30 December 1824 | No secretary | Francisco Cea Bermúdez | No regency | Ferdinand VII |

== See also ==
- Viceroyalty of Peru
- History of Peru
- List of presidents of Peru
