= List of noble houses =

A noble house is an aristocratic family or kinship group usually associated with hereditary titles. The most senior of which will be held by the "Head of the House" or patriarch. The concept is comparable with that of an aristocratic clan, and can be used informally to describe non-European ruling families.

When a reigning monarch is a member of a noble house, such as the House of Windsor, that house can also be considered a royal house. Many noble houses (such as the Houses of York and Lancaster) have birthed dynasties and have historically been considered royal houses, but in a contemporary sense, these houses may lose this status when the dynasty ends and their familial relationship with the position of power is superseded. A royal house is a type of noble house, and they are not separate or mutually exclusive entities.

Many of these houses are in several countries such as House of Butler which has held power and lands in countries such as France, Ireland, Germany and the UK.

== Asia ==
=== Arabia and the Levant ===
- House of Al-Afifi
- House of Abu Lahum
- House of Al-Alawiyya
- House of Al-Ahmar
- House of Al-ash-Sheikh
- House of Abaza
- House of Al-Atrash
- House of Al-Falahi
- House of Al-Falasi
- House of Al-Fayez
- House of Al-Fa'iz
- House of Al-Gilani
- House of Al-Harhara
- House of Al-Hashim
- House of Al-Husayni
- House of Al-Iryani
- House of Al-Jabriyun
- House of Al-Jarwani
- House of Al-Jayyusi
- House of Al-Maktoum
- House of Al-Mualla
- House of Al-Nabhani
- House of Al-Nahyan
- House of Al-Nuaimi
- House of Al-Qasimi
- House of Al-Qu'aiti
- House of Al-Rasheed
- House of Al-Rassi
- House of Al-Rasul
- House of Al-Sabah
- House of Al-Said
- House of Al-Saud
- House of Al-Sha'lan
- House of Al-Sharqi
- House of Al-Sudairi
- House of Al-Tahir
- House of Al-Usfuri
- House of Al-Ukhaidhir
- House of Al-Uqayli
- House of Al-Uyūnīyūn
- House of Al-Ya'rubi
- House of Al-Zaydina
- House of Al-Zou'bi
- House of Arslan
- House of Buhtur
- House of Idris
- House of Chehab
- House of Jumblatt
- House of Khalifah
- House of Ma'n
- House of Tavil

=== Bangladesh ===
- House of Prithimpassa
- House of Singranatore

=== Bhutan ===
- Druk Desis of Bhutan
- Wangchuck dynasty

=== Brunei ===
- House of Bolkiah

=== Cambodia ===
- House of Ang Chan
- House of Ang Duong
- House of Ang Eng
- House of Ang Mey
- House of Ang Non/Varman dynasty
- House of Norodom
- House of Sisowath

=== China ===
- House of Aisin-Gioro
- House of Ak-Kebek
- House of Cao Wei
- House of Chen
- House of Eastern Wu
- House of Han
- House of Liang
- House of Liao
- House of Liu Song
- House of Mi
- House of Min
- House of Nanyue
- House of Gao Qi
- House of Qi
- House of Sui
- House of Pinyin
- House of Qin
- House of Shang
- House of Shu Han
- House of Tang
- House of Wang Shu
- House of Jin
- House of Liang
- House of Wei
- House of Wuyue
- House of Yu/Xia
- House of Yan
- House of Yang Wu
- House of Zhao
- House of Zhou
- House of Zhu Liang

=== India ===
- Ahom dynasty
- Anga/Bali/Lunar dynasty
- Avanti/Haihaya dynasty
- Awadh dynasty
- Ay dynasty
- House of Bourbon-Bhopal
- Brihadratha dynasty
- Chalukya dynasty
- Chera dynasty
- Chola dynasty
- Dogra dynasty
- Gandhara dynasty
- Haryanka dynasty
- Kadamba dynasty
- Kalinga dynasty
- Kanva dynasty
- Kuru dynasty
- Kosala dynasty
- Mahameghavahana dynasty
- Mauryan dynasty
- Mughal dynasty
- Nanda dynasty
- Panchala dynasty
- Pandalam dynasty
- Pandya dynasty
- Pallava dynasty
- Tambapanni dynasty
- Tenkasi Pandyas dynasty
- Wadiyar dynasty
- Velir dynasty
- Videha dynasty
- Vishnukundina dynasty
- Satavahana dynasty
- Shaishunaga dynasty
- Shunga dynasty

=== Indonesia ===
- Surakarta Sunanate
- Yogyakarta Sultanate

=== Iran ===
- Historical landmark in Neyasar
- House of Nishapur
- Persepolis Takht-e Jamshīd
- Ctesiphon
- House of Pahlavi
- House of Qajar
- House of Keyhanian
- House of Afrasiyab
- House of Begzada Chalavi

=== Iraq ===
- House of Tavil
- House of Noori Aghal

=== Israel ===
- House of Saul
- House of David
- House of Jeroboam
- House of Baasha
- House of Zimri
- House of Tibni
- House of Omri
- House of Jehu
- House of Shallum
- House of Menahem/Gadi
- House of Pekah
- House of Hoshea

=== Japan ===
- House of Yamato
  - House of Minamoto
  - House of Taira
  - House of Fujiwara
  - House of Tachibana
- House of Minamoto
  - House of Akamatsu
  - House of Akechi
  - House of Akiyama
  - House of Amago
  - House of Asano
  - House of Ashikaga
  - House of Hachisuka
  - House of Hosokawa
  - House of Imagawa
  - House of Inoue
  - House of Ishikawa
  - House of Kanamaru
  - House of Kira
  - House of Kitabatake
  - House of Koga
  - House of Kuroda
  - House of Kyōgoku
  - House of Matsudaira
  - House of Miyake
  - House of Miyoshi
  - House of Mogami
  - House of Mori
  - House of Nanbu
  - House of Nitta
  - House of Ogasawara
  - House of Ōta
  - House of Rokkaku
  - House of Sakai
  - House of Sasaki
  - House of Satake
  - House of Satomi
  - House of Shiba
  - House of Shimazu
  - House of Takeda
  - House of Toki
  - House of Tokugawa
  - House of Yamana
  - House of Yanagisawa
  - House of Yonekura
  - House of Watanabe
- House of Taira
  - House of Hōjō
  - House of Chiba
  - House of Miura
  - House of Nagao
  - House of Hatakeyama
  - House of Oda
  - House of Tanegashima
  - House of Watanabe
- House of Fujiwara
  - Konoe family
  - Takatsukasa family
  - Kujō family
  - Nijō family
  - Ichijō family
- House of Tachibana

=== Korea ===
- Baekje dynasty
- Balhae dynasty
- Goguryeo dynasty
- Goryeo dynasty
- Joseon dynasty
- Silla dynasty

=== Malaysia ===
- House of Johor
- House of Kedah
- House of Kelantan
- House of Yamtuan
- House of Pahang
- House of Perak
- House of Perlis
- House of Selangor
- House of Terengganu

=== Mongolia ===
- House of Ak-Kebek
- Chagatai Khanate dynasty
- Choros dynasty
- Golden Horde dynasty
- Ilkhanate dynasty
- Khagan dynasty
- Yuan dynasty

=== Myanmar ===
- House of Ahom
- House of Ava
- House of Chiang Mai
- House of Early Bagan
- House of Hanthawaddy
- House of Konbaung
- House of Mrauk U
- House of Myinsaing
- House of Pagan (Bagan)
- House of Pinya
- House of Prome
- House of Rattanakosin
- House of Sagaing
- House of Soe Win (Restored Konbaung dynasty)
- House of Tagaung
- House of Toungoo

=== Nepal ===
- Panday dynasty
- Basnet dynasty
- Rana dynasty
- Thapa dynasty
- Shah dynasty
- Malla dynasty
- Chand dynasty
- Katyuri Clan
- Shakya Clan

=== Philippines ===
- House of Visayans
- House of Tagalog

=== Laos ===
- Lan Xang Hom Khao dynasty
- Khun Lo dynasty
- House of Champassak

=== Vietnam ===
- Lê dynasty
- Nguyễn Phúc dynasty
- Tây Sơn dynasty
- House of Trịnh

=== Sri Lanka ===
Royal Houses

- House of Vijaya
- House of Lambakanna I
- House of Moriya
- House of Lambakanna II
- House of Vijayabahu
- House of Kalinga
- House of Siri Sanga Bo
- House of Senasammata Vikramabahu
- House of Vimaladharmasuriya
- Nayaks of Kandy

Kingdom of Gampola

- House of Alakēśvara
- House of Senalahkadhikara

Kingdom of Kotte

- House of Alakēśvara
- House of Senalahkadhikara
- House of Kīravälle

Kingdom of Kandy

- House of Amunugama
- House of Angammana
- House of Dondanwela
- House of Dullewe
- House of Ehelepola
- House of Ellepola
- House of Galagoda
- House of Halangoda
- House of Keppetipola
- House of Kossinna
- House of Madugalle
- House of Migastenne
- House of Molligoda
- House of Nugawela
- House of Panabokke
- House of Pilimatalave
- House of Rambukwella
- House of Rammolaka
- House of Ratwatte
- House of Udugama
- House of Yalegoda

=== Thailand ===
- Phra Ruang dynasty
- Uthong dynasty
- Suphannaphum dynasty
- Sukhothai dynasty
- Prasat Thong dynasty
- Ban Phlu Luang dynasty
- Thonburi dynasty
- Chakri dynasty
- House of Abhaiwongse

=== Timor Leste ===
List House of Monarchs in West Timor Leste :

- House of Amabi
- House of Amakono
- House of Amanatun
- House of Amanuban
- House of Amarasi
- House of Amfoan
- House of Amfoan-Sorbian
- House of Belu Tadi Feto
- House of Biboki
- House of Dirma
- House of Fatuleu
- House of Fialaran
- House of Funai
- House of Insana
- House of Jenilu
- House of Kupang
- House of Lakekun
- House of Lamaknen (Maere)
- House of Makir
- House of Lamassane
- House of Lanquiero
- House of Lansiolat
- House of Lidak
- House of Manubait
- House of Mollo
- House of Naitimu
- House of Noimuti
- House of Seisal
- House of Silawan
- House of Sonbai Besar
- House of Sonbai Kecil
- House of Taebenu
- House of Takaip
- House of Tiris-Mauta
- House of Tirilolo (Betulale)
- House of Wehali
- House of Wewiku

List House of Monarchs in East Timor Leste :

- House of Aileu
- House of Ainaro
- House of Alas
- House of Ambeno
- House of Atabae
- House of Atsabe
- House of Balibo
- House of Barique
- House of Baucau
- House of Bebico
- House of Bercoly (Fatumarto)
- House of Bibiluto
- House of Bibissuço
- House of Bobonaro
- House of Cailaco
- House of Caimau
- House of Cairui
- House of Camenaça
- House of Claco
- House of Cotubaba
- House of Cova
- House of Dailor
- House of Deribate
- House of Dote
- House of Ermera
- House of Failacor
- House of Fatuboro
- House of Fatumean
- House of Faturó
- House of Funar
- House of Hera
- House of Laclo
- House of Laclubar
- House of Lacluta
- House of Lacore
- House of Laga
- House of Laleia
- House of Leimeia
- House of Liquiçá
- House of Lolotoe
- House of Luca
- House of Mahubo
- House of Malaka-Belu
- House of Manatuto
- House of Manufahi
- House of Manumera
- House of Maubara
- House of Maucatar
- House of Motael
- House of Nusadila
- House of Oecussi
- House of Ossoroa
- House of Ossu
- House of Raimean
- House of Samoro
- House of Saniri
- House of Sarau
- House of Souro-Lospalos
- House of Suai
- House of Turiscai
- House of Tutuluru
- House of Ulmera
- House of Vemasse (Ade)
- House of Venilale
- House of Vessoro
- House of Viqueque

== Europe ==
=== England, Great Britain, United Kingdom ===
- House of Aberffraw
- House of Abney-Hastings
- House of Addington
- House of Addison
- House of Agnew
- House of Allenby
- House of Anderson
- House of Anson
- House of Arden
- House of Armstrong
- House of Armstrong-Jones
- House of Ashburner
- House of Ashley-Cooper
- House of Asquith
- House of Astor
- House of Attlee
- House of Baden-Powell
- House of Bagot
- House of Bailey
- House of Baldwin
- House of Balfour
- House of Bannerman
- House of Barclay
- House of Baring
- House of Baskerville
- House of Basset
- House of Bathurst
- House of Beauchamp
- House of Beauclerk
- House of Beaufort
- House of Beaumont
- House of Benn
- House of Bennett
- House of Bentinck
- House of Berkeley
- House of Blackadder
- House of Bohun
- House of Boleyn
- House of Bonham Carter
- House of Bouverie
- House of Bowes-Lyon
- House of Boyd
- House of Boyle
- House of Bridgeman
- House of Bruce
- House of Brudenell-Bruce
- House of Buccleuch
- House of Buchan
- House of Buchanan
- House of Byng
- House of Byron
- House of Cadogan
- House of Cairns
- House of Cameron
- House of Campbell
- House of Capell
- House of Carnegie
- House of Cary
- House of Cathcart
- House of Cavendish
- House of Cecil
- House of Charteris
- House of Chetwynd-Talbot
- House of Cholmondeley
- House of Churchill
- House of Clive
- House of Cochrane
- House of Coke
- House of Coleridge
- House of Compton
- House of Conant
- House of Cooper
- House of Corbet
- House of Cornwallis
- House of Courtenay
- House of Coventry
- House of Cranstoun
- House of Crewe-Milnes
- House of Crichton
- House of Crichton-Stuart
- House of Croft
- House of Cromwell
- House of Cunliffe-Lister
- House of Cunningham
- House of Dalrymple
- House of De Burgh
- House of De Carteret
- House of De Clare
- House of De Havilland
- House of De Montfort
- House of De Ros
- House of De Vere
- House of De Warrenne
- House of Delaval
- House of Douglas
- House of Drummond
- House of Dundas
- House of Dunkeld
- House of Eden
- House of Edgcumbe
- House of Egerton
- House of Eliot
- House of Elton
- House of Fairfax
- House of Fane
- House of Feilding
- House of Ferrers
- House of Fiennes
- House of Fiennes-Clinton
- House of Finch
- House of Finch-Hatton
- House of FitzAlan
- House of FitzClarence
- House of FitzGeorge
- House of FitzHamon
- House of FitzHugh
- House of FitzJames
- House of FitzRoy
- House of FitzWalter
- House of FitzWilliam
- House of Foljambe
- House of Fortescue
- House of Fox
- House of Gathorne-Hardy
- House of Godolphin
- House of Godwin
- House of Gordon
- House of Gordon-Lennox
- House of Gough-Calthorpe
- House of Graham
- House of Greville
- House of Grey
- House of Grierson
- House of Grimston
- House of Grindlay
- House of Grosvenor
- House of Haden-Guest
- House of Hamilton
- House of Hanbury-Tracy
- House of Harley
- House of Harris
- House of Hastings
- House of Hay
- House of Herbert
- House of Hervey
- House of Hicks Beach
- House of Hobart
- House of Hogg
- House of Home
- House of Hope
- House of Howard
- House of Howe
- House of Hughes
- House of Hungerford
- House of Hussey-Montagu
- House of Hyde
- House of Irvine
- House of Isaacs
- House of James
- House of Jellicoe
- House of Jenkinson
- House of Johnstone
- House of Keith
- House of Kennedy
- House of Kerr
- House of Kingsbury
- House of Kinnaird
- House of Knatchbull
- House of Knýtlinga
- House of Lambton
- House of Lancaster
- House of Lascelles
- House of Lawson
- House of Le Despencer
- House of Legge
- House of Lennox
- House of Leslie
- House of Leveson-Gower
- House of Lindsay
- House of Longe
- House of Lowther
- House of Lloyd George
- House of Lumley
- House of Lyon
- House of Lyttelton
- House of Lytton
- House of MacAlpin
- House of Macdonald
- House of MacGregor
- House of Mackintosh
- House of MacLellan
- House of MacLeod
- House of MacMillan
- House of Macpherson
- House of MacTavish
- House of MacThomas
- House of Maitland
- House of Mancroft
- House of Manners
- House of Manners-Sutton
- House of Marks
- House of Marsham
- House of Mercia
- House of Mills
- House of Mitford
- House of Monckton
- House of Mond
- House of Money-Coutts
- House of Montagu
- House of Montagu Douglas Scott
- House of Montagu-Stuart-Wortley-Mackenzie
- House of Montgomerie
- House of Montgomery
- House of Morgan
- House of Mortimer
- House of Mosley
- House of Mountbatten
- House of Mountbatten-Windsor
- House of Mowbray
- House of Murray
- House of Myddelton
- House of Mynors
- House of Nall-Cain
- House of Napier
- House of Nathan
- House of Neville
- House of Newport
- House of Noel
- House of Normandy
- House of North
- House of Northcote
- House of Ogilvy
- House of Ogle
- House of Onslow
- House of Osborne
- House of Paget
- House of Palmer
- House of Parker
- House of Patrixbourne
- House of Miskito
- House of Paulet
- House of Peel
- House of Pelham
- House of Pelham-Clinton
- House of Pepys
- House of Percy
- House of Petty-FitzMaurice
- House of Philipps
- House of Phipps
- House of Pitt
- House of Plantagenet
- House of Pratt
- House of Primrose
- House of Ramsay
- House of Rich
- House of Robinson
- House of Rodney
- House of Roper
- House of Rothschild
- House of Rous
- House of Russell
- House of Ruthven
- House of Ryder
- House of Sackville
- House of Samuel
- House of Scott
- House of Scrymgeour
- House of Scudamore
- House of Selby
- House of Seymour
- House of Shirley
- House of Silkin
- House of Sinclair
- House of Sinha
- House of Spencer
- House of Spencer-Stanhope
- House of Stanhope
- House of Stanley
- House of St. Leger
- House of Stratford
- House of Strutt
- House of Stuart
- House of Sudeley
- House of Swinton
- House of Talbot
- House of Tempest
- House of Thesiger
- House of Thynne
- House of Tollemache
- House of Townshend
- House of Tudor
- House of Twisleton-Wykeham-Fiennes
- House of Tyndall
- House of Vane
- House of Vane-Tempest-Stewart
- House of Vernon
- House of Villiers
- House of Vivian
- House of Waldegrave
- House of Wallace
- House of Wallop
- House of Walpole
- House of Ward
- House of Watson-Wentworth
- House of Wedgwood
- House of Wellesley
- House of Wentworth
- House of Wessex
- House of Williams-Wynn
- House of Windsor
- House of Windsor-Clive
- House of Wodehouse
- House of Wood
- House of Woodville
- House of York
- House of Zouche

=== Ireland ===
- House of Beresford
- House of Boyle
- House of Brabazon
- House of Browne
- House of Butler
- House of Carpenter
- House of Chichester
- House of Conyngham
- House of FitzDermot
- House of FitzGerald
- House of Fitzmaurice
- House of FitzPatrick
- House of Forbes
- House of Gore
- House of Guinness
- House of Hamilton
- House of Hill
- House of Horsley-Beresford
- House of Jocelyn
- House of King
- House of Lamb
- House of Lambart
- House of Loftus
- House of MacCarthy
- House of MacDermot
- House of MacMurrough Kavanagh
- House of McCartan
- House of McGillycuddy
- House of McInerney
- House of Meade
- House of Moore
- House of Nugent
- House of O'Brien
- House of O'Byrne
- House of O'Callaghan
- House of O'Conor
- House of O'Donnell
- House of O'Donovan
- House of Ó Faircheallaigh
- House of Ó Faoláin
- House of Ó Fearghail
- House of O'Neill
- House of O'Rourke
- House of O'Morchoe
- House of O'Connell
- House of O'Dwyer
- House of O'Sullivan
- House of O'Toole
- House of Pakenham
- House of Petty
- House of Ponsonby
- House of Power
- House of Savile
- House of Smythe
- House of St. Leger
- House of Stopford
- House of Taylour
- House of Temple
- House of Tottenham
- House of Tracy
- House of Turnour
- House of Wellesley

=== France ===
- House of Adhémar
- House of Agoult
- House of Aguesseau
- House of Albret
- House of Amboise
- House of Amelot
- House of Anglure
- House of Anjou
- House of Armagnac
- House of Arpajon
- House of Artois
- House of Arzillières
- House of Astarac
- House of Aubigné
- House of Aubusson
- House of Aumale
- House of Aumont
- House of Authier
- House of Auxy
- House of Avesnes
- House of Baillet
- House of Barras
- House of Barrau
- House of Baudement
- House of Bauffremont
- House of Baux
- House of Beauharnais
- House of Beaumont (Dauphiné)
- House of Beaumont (Normandy)
- House of Beauvau
- House of Beauvilliers
- House of Bellême
- House of Bellièvre
- House of Berthier
- House of Berton des Balbes de Crillon
- House of Béthune
- House of Bidal d'Asfeld
- House of Bigot (Berry)
- House of Bigot (Normandy)
- House of Brichanteau
- House of Bizemont
- House of Blacas
- House of Blois
- House of Bonaparte
- House of Bonne
- House of Bougainville
- House of Bourbon
- House of Bourbon-Vendôme
- House of Bournonville
- House of Boyer de Fonscolombe
- House of Brancas
- House of Breteuil
- House of Brienne
- House of Broglie
- House of Brûlart
- House of Campdavène
- House of Capet
- House of Castellane
- House of Castries
- House of Caumont
- House of Chacenay
- House of Champlitte-Pontailler
- House of Chappes
- House of Chastenet de Puységur
- House of Chateaubriand
- House of Châtillon
- House of Chaumont
- House of Chaumont-Quitry
- House of Choiseul
- House of Clefmont
- House of Clermont
- House of Clermont-Nesle
- House of Clermont-Tonnerre
- House of Créquy
- House of Crozat
- House of Crussol
- House of Crussol d'Uzès
- House of Coëtlogon
- House of Colbert
- House of Coligny
- House of Cossé-Brissac
- House of Coucy
- House of Courtenay
- House of Croÿ
- House of Damas
- House of Dammartin-Montdidier
- House of Dampierre
- House of Dampierre-en-Astenois
- House of Dionis du Séjour
- House of Doujat
- House of Dreux
- House of Dreux-Brézé
- House of Durfort
- House of Esparbès de Lussan
- House of Estaing
- House of Estampes
- House of Estienne
- House of Estrées
- House of Évreux
- House of Faucogney
- House of Faÿ
- House of Félix
- House of Ferron
- House of Foix
- House of Forcade
- House of Fouché d'Otrante
- House of Fouquet
- House of Franquetot
- House of Galard
- House of Gâtinais-Anjou
- House of Gaultier de Brûlon
- House of Girard de Bazoges
- House of Gontaut-Biron
- House of Gouffier
- House of Grailly
- House of Gramont
- House of Grimaldi
- House of Guignard de Saint-Priest
- House of Guinot-Chopard de Louvois de Valmont
- House of Guise
- House of Ham
- House of Harcourt
- House of Hauteclocque
- House of Hauteville
- House of Hédouville
- House of Hozier
- House of Jaucourt
- House of Joinville
- House of Joussineau de Tourdonnet
- House of Juchault
- House of La Bourdonnaye
- House of La Fare
- House of La Fayette
- House of La Force
- House of La Motte
- House of La Poype
- House of La Roche-Aymon
- House of La Rochefoucauld
- House of La Rochejacquelein
- House of La Tour d'Auvergne
- House of La Tour de Saint-Vidal
- House of La Tour du Pin
- House of La Trémoille
- House of Laborde
- House of Labriffe
- House of Lacretelle
- House of Lamoignon
- House of Lanjuinais
- House of Laval
- House of Le Clerc de Juigné
- House of Le Fèvre de Caumartin
- House of Le Normand de Bretteville
- House of Le Peletier
- House of Le Tellier de Louvois
- House of Le Tonnelier de Breteuil
- House of Le Veneur de Tillières
- House of Lefèvre d'Ormesson
- House of Lévis
- House of Lorraine
- House of Lusignan
- House of Maillé
- House of Mailly
- House of Malherbe (Maine)
- House of Malherbe (Normandy)
- House of Maret de Bassano
- House of Maupeou
- House of Mévouillon
- House of Milly
- House of Molé
- House of Monchy
- House of Montauban
- House of Montdidier
- House of Montfort
- House of Montmorency
- House of Montrichard
- House of Monpezat
- House of Montesquiou
- House of Montmirail
- House of Montoire
- House of Moreuil-Soissons
- House of Mortimer
- House of Neufville de Villeroy
- House of Nicolay
- House of Noailles
- House of Nogaret de La Vallette
- House of Nogent-en-Bassigny
- House of Nompère
- House of Normandy
- House of Noüe
- House of Noyers
- House of Nully
- House of Orléans
- House of Orléans-Longueville
- House of Pardaillan
- House of Pas de Feuquières
- House of Pérusse des Cars
- House of Phélypeaux
- House of Pineton de Chambrun
- House of Plancy
- House of Poitiers
- House of Polignac
- House of Poligny
- House of Pons
- House of Ponthieu
- House of Portalis
- House of Potier
- House of Preissac
- House of Reille
- House of Riquet de Caraman
- House of Rochechouart
- House of Rohan
- House of Rohan-Chabot
- House of Roquefeuil-Anduze
- House of Roquefeuil-Blanquefort
- House of Rougé
- House of Rouillé (Brittany)
- House of Roullet de La Bouillerie
- House of Rousseau de Saint-Aignan
- House of Rouvroy de Saint Simon
- House of Ruzé
- House of Saint-Aubin
- House of Saint-Exupéry
- House of Saint-Germain
- House of Saint-Nectaire
- House of Saint-Omer
- House of Saint-Pern
- House of Sainte-Hermine
- House of Saintignon
- House of Saulx-Tavannes
- House of Séguier
- House of Seguins
- House of Ségur
- House of Sérent
- House of Sesmaisons
- House of Sévigné
- House of Sèze
- House of Soult
- House of Soyécourt
- House of Tabouillot
- House of Talhouët
- House of Tascher
- House of Talleyrand-Périgord
- House of Testu de Balincourt
- House of Thoire-Villars
- House of Thourotte
- House of Tosny
- House of Traînel
- House of Trencavel
- House of Tryon
- House of Valois
- House of Valon
- House of Vasselot
- House of Vendeuvre
- House of Vergy
- House of Vichy
- House of Viénot de Vaublanc
- House of Vignerot
- House of Vignory
- House of Villaret
- House of Villars (Dombes)
- House of Villars (Lyonnais)
- House of Villehardouin
- House of Villèle
- House of Villemaur
- House of Villeneuve (Languedoc)
- House of Villeneuve (Provence)
- House of Villiers de L'Isle-Adam
- House of Vimeur
- House of Voyer de Paulmy d'Argenson
- House of Yse

=== Holy Roman Empire and Germany ===
- House of Abensberg-Traun
- House of Ascania
- House of Amsberg
- House of Auersperg
- House of Babenberg
- House of Battenberg
- House of Beck of Baden
- House of Bentheim
- House of Bibra
- House of Bismarck
- House of Breuberg
- House of Czernin
- House of Clary and Aldringen
- House of Colloredo-Mansfeld
- House of Dietrichstein
- House of Eggenberg
- House of Esterházy
- House of Falkenstein
- House of Formbach/Fornbach
- House of Förnbacher
- House of Franckenstein
- House of Fugger-Babenhausen
- House of Fürstenberg
- House of Goltz
- House of Gravenreuth
- House of Glücksburg
- House of Habsburg
- House of Hanover
- House of Harrach
- House of Hesse
- House of Hohenberg
- House of Hohenlohe
- House of Hohenstaufen
- House of Hohenzollern
- House of Isenburg
- House of Khevenhüller
- House of Kinsky
- House of Kowalczyk
- House of La Marck
- House of Leiningen
- House of Lichnowsky
- House of Liechtenstein
- House of Limburg
- House of Limburg-Stirum
- House of Lippe
- House of Lobkowicz
- House of Löwenstein-Wertheim
- House of Luxembourg
- House of Mecklenburg
- House of Metternich
- House of Nagel
- House of Nassau
- House of Oettingen-Oettingen
- House of Oldenburg
- House of Orsini-Rosenberg
- House of Ortenburg
- House of Pappenheim
- House of Putbus
- House of Rennenkampff
- House of Reuss
- House of Richthofen
- House of Salian
- House of Salm
- House of Saxe-Coburg and Gotha
- House of Sayn-Wittgenstein
- House of Schönborn
- House of Schönburg
- House of Schwarzburg
- House of Schwarzenberg
- House of Sinzendorf
- House of Solms-Braunfels
- House of Starhemberg
- House of Stolberg
- House of Thannhausen
- House of Thun and Hohenstein
- House of Thurn and Taxis
- House of Urach
- House of Waldburg
- House of Waldeck and Pyrmont
- House of Waldstein
- House of Welf
- House of Wettin
- House of Windisch-Graetz
- House of Wittelsbach
- House of Württemberg
- House of Zähringen

=== The Low Countries of the Habsburg Netherlands ===
- House of Ardenne
- House of Arenberg
- House of Baillet
- House of Beaufort-Spontin
- House of Belgium
- House of Chalon
- House of Chasteler
- House of Chimay
- House of Croÿ
- House of Dampierre
- House of De Borchgrave
- House of De Lannoy
- House of De Witte
- House of D'Udekem
- House of Egmond
- House of Goubau
- House of Goëss-Saurau
- House of Hénin
- House of Hornes
- House of Ligne
- House of Looz-Corswarem
- House of Merode
- House of Nassau-Weilburg
- House of Orange-Nassau
- House of Parthon
- House of Snoy et d'Oppuers
- House of Spoelberch
- House of Terlinden
- House of Trazegnies
- House of Ursel
- House of Valois-Burgundy
- House of van den Bergh
- House of van den Bosch
- House of van de Werve
- House of van der Noot
- House of Van Rechteren
- House of Van Renesse
- House of Van Voorst tot Voorst
- House of Van Wassenaer
- House of Van Watervliet
- House of Wavrin
- Seven Noble Houses of Brussels
  - House of Coudenbergh
  - House of Roodenbeke
  - House of Serhuyghs
  - House of Serroelofs
  - House of Sleeus
  - House of Steenweeghs
  - House of Sweerts

=== Italy and the Papal States ===
- House of Appiani
- House of Alberti
- House of Albizzi
- House of Aldobrandeschi
- House of Aldobrandini
- House of Altoviti
- House of Anscarids
- House of Barberini
- Barbiano di Belgiojoso
- House of Bardi
- House of Boncompagni
- House of Borghese
- House of Borgia
- House of Borromeo
- House of Bourbon-Parma
- House of Bourbon-Two Sicilies
- House of Caetani
- House of Canossa
- House of Caracciolo
- House of Chigi
- House of Colonna
- House of Cybo
- House of D'Aquino
- House of Della Gherardesca
- House of Della Rovere
- House of Della Torre
- House of Dentice
- House of Dolfin
- House of Doria-Pamphili-Landi
- House of Drouot
- House of Erba-Odescalchi
- House of Este
- House of Etruria
- House of Farnese
- House of Fieschi
- House of Fisichella
- House of Gerace
- House of Gherardini
- House of Gonzaga
- House of Hauteville
- House of Loredan
- House of Malaspina
- House of Mancini
- House of Massimo
- House of Mattei
- House of Medici
- House of Montefeltro
- House of Obertenghi
- House of Orsini
- House of Pallavicini
- House of Pazzi
- House of Pignatelli
- House of Riario
- House of Ruffo
- House of Ruspoli
- House of Sacchetti
- House of Salamon
- House of Salviati
- House of Sanseverino
- House of Savoy
- House of Sforza
- House of Simonetti
- House of Spinola
- House of Strozzi
- House of Torlonia
- House of Tuscany
- House of Venier
- House of Ventimiglia
- House of Visconti
- House of Vitelli

=== Spain and Portugal ===
- House of Ágreda
- House of Alba
- House of Alburquerque
- House of Álvarez-Cuevas
- House of Álvarez de Toledo
- House of Andrade
- House of Arellano
- House of Argavieso
- House of Arias-Navarro
- House of Balda
- House of Barcelona
- House of Bernaldo de Quirós
- House of Bettencourt
- House of Braganza
- House of Bourbon-Anjou
- House of Butrón
- House of Cabrera
- House of Cadaval
- House of Calvo
- House of Calvo-Sotelo
- House of Camara
- House of Camondo
- House of Carrero-Blanco
- House of Carrillo
- House of Carvajal
- House of Carvalho
- House of Castro
- House of Contreras
- House of Correia
- House of Corte-Real
- House of Cotoner
- House of Dávalos
- House of Duque de Estrada
- House of Enríquez
- House of Entença
- House of Fajardo
- House of Fernández de Córdoba
- House of Franco
- House of Fuenmayor
- House of Gonçalves da Câmara
- House of González de Cossío
- House of Godoy
- House of Guzmán
- House of Haro
- House of Hoyos
- House of Íñiguez
- House of Jiménez
- House of la Cerda
- House of Lara
- House of Lasso de la Vega
- House of Latas
- House of Lombillo
- House of Loyola
- House of Luzárraga
- House of Maia
- House of Marcoartu
- House of Maroto
- House of Martínez de Irujo
- House of Medina Sidonia
- House of Medinaceli
- House of Menéndez de Avilés
- House of Méndez de Sotomayor
- House of Mendoza
- House of Mier
- House of Montcada
- House of Moctezuma
- House of Mola
- House of Moscardó
- House of Narro
- House of Noronha
- House of Olivares
- House of Osorio
- House of Osuna
- House of Pardo
- House of Peñalver
- House of Pimentel
- House of Ponce de León
- House of Portocarrero
- House of Queipo de Llano
- House of Queiroz
- House of Quiñones
- House of Primo de Rivera
- House of Rincón-Gallardo
- House of Rodríguez de Valcárcel
- House of Rojas
- House of Sandoval y Rojas
- House of Sarmiento
- House of Silva
- House of Sousa
- House of Tagle
- House of Traba
- House of Trastámara
- House of Velarde
- House of Vivanco
- House of Zúñiga

=== Polish–Lithuanian Commonwealth ===
- House of Albarosa
- House of Czartoryski
- House of Czetwertyński
- House of Giedroyć
- House of Griffins
- House of Jabłecki-Meçiński
- House of Jabłonowski
- House of Jagiellon
- House of Kalinowski
- House of Koniecpolski
- House of Kurozwęki
- House of Krasiński
- House of Leszczyński
- House of Libice
- House of Łowicz
- House of Lubomirski
- House of Miełżyński
- House of Mniszech
- House of Mystkowski
- House of Ogiński
- House of Opaliński
- House of Ossoliński
- House of Ostoja
- House of Ostrogski
- House of Piast
- House of Poniatowski
- House of Potocki
- House of Radziwiłł
- House of Sanguszko
- House of Sapieha
- House of Sas
- House of Sobieski
- House of Sułkowski
- House of Szlachta
- House of Wiśniowiecki
- House of Zamoyski
- House of Zasławski

=== Holy Crown Lands of Hungary (Contemporary Hungary, Transylvania, Czechia and Slovakia) ===
- House of Aba
- House of Andechs
- House of Andrássy
- House of Apor
- House of Apponyi
- House of Báthory
- House of Batthyány-Strattmann
- House of Bebek
- House of Bethlen
- House of Csányi
- House of Eötvös
- House of Ernuszt
- House of Esterházy
- House of Festetics
- House of Forgách
- House of Förnbacher de Austria
- House of Garai
- House of Hunyadi
- House of Kálnoky
- House of Kubinyi
- House of Lázár
- House of Mattyasovszky
- House of Mikes
- House of Monok
- House of Nádasdy
- House of Pálffy de Erdőd
- House of Pap
- House of Perneszy
- House of Podmanitzky
- House of Pongrácz
- House of Pop
- House of Ráday
- House of Rákóczi
- House of Révay
- House of Rosty/Rosti de BarkóczRévay Family
- House of Széchenyi
- House of Szilágyi
- House of Teleki
- House of Thurzó
- House of Tisza
- House of Ugron
- House of Zápolya
- House of Zichy

=== Carpathian states (Wallachia Romania and Moldavia) ===
- House of Basarab
- House of Bogdan-Mușat
- House of Brâncoveanu
- House of Brătianu
- House of Cantacuzino
- House of Cantemir
- House of Caradja
- House of Craiovești
- House of Dănești
- House of Drăculești
- House of Dragoș
- House of Ghica
- House of Kogălniceanu
- House of Moruzi
- House of Movilă
- House of Kretzulescu (Crețulescu)
- House of Racoviță
- House of Romania
- House of Rosetti
- House of Sturdza
- House of Șoldănești
- House of Văcărescu
- House of Ypsilantis

=== Nordic countries ===
- House of Awaldzstadom
- House of Ahlefeldt
- House of Benkestok
- House of Bernadotte
- House of Bjelke
- House of Brahe
- House of Danneskiold-Samsøe
- House of Estridsen
- House of Essen
- House of Fabritius de Tengnagel
- House of Falkenskiold
- House of Falsen
- House of Fersen
- House of Gyldenstierne
- House of Gyllenhaal
- House of Güldencrone
- House of Igelström
- House of Knagenhjelm
- House of Knýtlinga
- House of Koskull
- House of Lagergren
- House of Lieven
- House of Løvenørn
- House of Mannerheim
- House of Munso
- House of Munthe af Morgenstierne
- House of Neergaard
- House of Oxenstierna
- House of Reventlow
- House of Rosenkrantz
- House of Rosensverd
- House of Schleswig-Holstein-Sonderburg-Augustenburg
- House of Schulman
- House of Staël von Holstein
- House of Stockfleth
- House of Svanenhielm
- House of Sverre
- House of Tooke
- House of Vasa
- House of Werenskiold
- House of Wrangel

=== Russia, Georgia, Armenia ===
- House of Abashidze
- House of Abashidze-Gorlenko
- House of Ak-Kebek
- House of Amilakhvari
- House of Amirejibi
- House of Avalishvili
- House of Bagration
- House of Baratashvili
- House of Barclay de Tolly
- House of Belosselsky-Belozersky
- House of Belsky
- House of Chavchavadze
- House of Chichua
- House of Chikovani
- House of Dadeshkeliani
- House of Dadiani
- House of Demidov
- House of Diasamidze
- House of Dolgorukov
- House of Dondukov
- House of Drutsky
- House of Durnovo
- House of Gagarin
- House of Garsevanishvili
- House of Gelovani
- House of Golitsyn
- House of Gorchakov
- House of Guramishvili
- House of Gurgenidze
- House of Gurieli
- House of Izmaylov
- House of Jaqeli
- House of Javakhishvili
- House of Kurakin
- House of Lieven
- House of Lyapunov
- House of Menshikov
- House of Meshchersky
- House of Mikeladze
- House of Mstislavsky
- House of Obolensky
- House of Odoyevsky
- House of Orbeliani
- House of Orlov
- House of Pahlen
- House of Pavlenishvili
- House of Razumovsky
- House of Repnin
- House of Romanov
- House of Romodanovsky
- House of Rurik
- House of Rzhevsky
- House of Shalikashvili
- House of Sheremetev
- House of Shervashidze
- House of Skoropadsky
- House of Stasov
- House of Stroganov
- House of Tolstoy
- House of Trubetskoy
- House of Tsereteli
- House of Vorontsov
- House of Yuryevsky
- House of Yusupov
- House of Zubov

=== Albania ===
- House of Arianiti
- House of Kastrioti
- House of Muzaka
- House of Zogu
- House of Dukagjini
- House of Thopia
- House of Gropa
- House of Progoni
- House of Balsha
- House of Zenevisi
- House of Shpata
- House of Zaharia
- House of Spani
- House of Mataranga
- House of Begolli

=== Western Balkan states (Bosnia, Croatia, Montenegro, Serbia) ===
==== Bosnian ====
- House of Boričević
- House of Hrvatinić
- House of Šantić
- House of Kosača
- House of Kotromanić
- House of Ljubibratić
- House of Miloradović
- House of Nikolić
- House of Pavlović
- House of Radivojević
- House of Sanković
- House of Vilić
- House of Zlatonosović
- House of Mladenović

==== Croatian ====
- House of Berislavić
- House of Crnković
- House of Drašković
- House of Frankopan
- House of Jelačić
- House of Kačić
- House of Keglević
- House of Kurjaković
- House of Nelipić
- House of Pejačević
- House of Trpimirović
- House of Šubić
- House of Talovac
- House of Vilić
- House of Zrinski

==== Montenegrin ====
- House of Balšić
- House of Crnojević
- House of Petrović-Njegoš

==== Serbian ====
- House of Bakić
- House of Balšić
- House of Branković
- House of Dejanović
- House of Golemović
- House of Karađorđević
- House of Jakšić
- House of Lazarević
- House of Mrnjavčević
- House of Musić
- House of Nemanjić
- House of Obrenović
- House of Paskačić
- House of Preljubović
- House of Rastislalić
- House of Vlastimirović
- House of Vojislavljević
- House of Vukanović

=== The Byzantine Empire, Greece and Crusader States of the Levant ===
- House of Angelos
- House of Bagratuni
- House of Calogerà
- House of Châteaudun
- House of Châtillon
- House of Crispo
- House of De la Roche
- House of Doukas
- House of Grenier
- House of Gattilusi
- House of Ghisi
- House of Giustiniani
- House of Hauteville
- House of Ibelin
- House of Kantakouzenos
- House of Komnenos
- House of Kourkouas
- House of Laskaris
- House of Lusignan
- House of Madi
- House of Maleinos
- House of Mavrocordatos
- House of Mavromichalis
- Houses of Montlhéry and Le Puiset
- House of Palaiologos
- House of Philanthropenos
- House of Phokas
- House of Rubenid
- House of Saint Omer
- House of Sanudo
- House of Sgouros
- House of Skleros
- House of Tarchaneiotes
- House of Theotokis
- House of Tocco
- House of Toulouse
- House of Vatatzes
- House of Venieris
- House of Villehardouin
- House of Ypsilantis
- House of Zaccaria

== The Americas ==
=== Argentina ===
- House of Araucanía-Patagonia

=== Brazil ===
- House of Braganza
- House of Orléans-Braganza

=== Bolivia ===
- House of Pinedo

=== Canada ===
- House of Watervliet

=== Colombia ===
- House of Arboleda
- House of Caicedo
- House of Holguín
- House of Mosquera
- House of Vergara

=== Ecuador ===
- House of Luzárraga

=== Haiti ===
- House of Christophe
- House of Dessalines
- House of Soulouque

=== Honduras ===
- House of Miskito

=== Cuba ===
List of noble titles by Spanish Monarchs in Cuba :

- Duke of Mola
- Duke of La Torre
- Duke of La Union of Cuba
- Marquess of Casa Calvo
- Marquess of Havana
- Count of Santa Clara
- Count of Venadito
- Barón of Maials
- Viscount of Cuba

=== Mexico ===
- House of Cámara
- House of Iturbide
- House of Moctezuma
- House of Villagómez

=== Nicaragua ===
- House of Miskito

=== Peru ===
List Viceroy of Peru :

- Blasco Núñez Vela
- Pedro de la Gasca
- Antonio de Mendoza, Marquis of Mondéjar, Count of Tendilla
- Melchor Bravo de Saravia
- Andrés Hurtado de Mendoza, 3rd Marquis of Cañete
- Diego López de Zúñiga, 4th Count of Nieva
- Juan de Saavedra
- Lope García de Castro
- Francisco de Toledo
- Martín Enríquez de Almanza
- Cristóbal Ramírez de Cartagena
- Fernando Torres de Portugal y Mesía, 1st Count of Villadompardo
- García Hurtado de Mendoza, 5th Marquis of Cañete
- Luis de Velasco, 1st Marquess of Salinas del Río Pisuerga
- Gaspar de Zúñiga, 5th Count of Monterrey
- Juan de Mendoza y Luna, Marquis of Montesclaros
- Francisco de Borja y Aragón, Count of Rebolledo, Prince of Esquilache
- Juan Jiménez de Montalvo
- Diego Fernández de Córdoba, 1st Marquess of Guadalcázar
- Luis Jerónimo de Cabrera, 4th Count of Chinchón
- Pedro de Toledo, 1st Marquis of Mancera
- García Sarmiento de Sotomayor, 2nd Count of Salvatierra
- Luis Enríquez de Guzmán, 9th Count of Alba de Liste
- Diego de Benavidez, 8th Count of Santisteban
- Bernardo de Iturriaza
- Pedro Antonio Fernández de Castro, 10th Count of Lemos
- Bernardo de Iturriaza
- Baltasar de la Cueva, Count of Castellar, Marquis of Malagon
- Melchor de Liñán y Cisneros, Archbishop of Lima
- Melchor de Navarra, Duke of Palata, Prince of Massalubrense
- Melchor Portocarrero, 3rd Count of Monclova
- Juan Peñalosa dan Benavides
- Manuel de Oms, 1st Marquess of Castelldosrious, Grandee of Spain
- Miguel Núñez de Sanabria
- Diego Ladrón de Guevara, Bishop of Quito
- Mateo de la Mata Ponce de León
- Diego Morcillo Rubio de Auñón, Archbishop of Lima
- Carmine Caracciolo, 5th Prince of Santo Buono
- José de Armendáriz, 1st Marquis of Castelfuerte
- José Antonio de Mendoza, 3rd Marquis of Villagarcía
- José Manso de Velasco, 1st Count of Superunda
- The Most Excellent Manuel de Amat y Junyent
- Manuel de Guirior, Marquess of Guirior
- Don Agustín de Jáuregui, Order of Santiago
- Teodoro de Croix,34th Viceroy of Peru
- Francisco Gil de Taboada
- Ambrosio O'Higgins, 1st Marquess of Osorno
- Manuel Arredondo Pelegrín
- Gabriel de Avilés, 4th Marquis of Avilés
- José Fernando de Abascal y Sousa, 1st Marquess of Concordia
- Joaquín de la Pezuela, 1st Marquess of Viluma
- José de la Serna, 1st Count of the Andes
- Pío de Tristán, the last Viceroy of Peru

=== United States of America ===
- House of Watervliet

== Africa ==
=== The Maghreb Region ===
- House of Al-Alawi
- House of Al-Idrisi
- House of Al-Marin
- House of Al-Wattas
- House of Al-Zayyan

=== Benin ===
- House of De Souza
- House of Aladaxonou

=== Burundi ===
- House of Ntwero

=== Cameroon ===
- Njoya

=== The Congo ===
- House of Kinkanga
- House of Kilukeni
- House of Kimpanzu
- House of Kwilu

=== Ghana ===
- Oyoko dynasty

=== Egypt and Sudan ===
- House of Abaza
- Muhammad Ali dynasty
- Yeghen Family

=== Eswatini ===
- House of Dlamini

=== Ethiopia ===
- House of Solomon
- Zagwe dynasty

=== Lesotho ===
- House of Moshoeshoe

=== Libya ===
- House of Shennib

=== Madagascar ===
- Andriana
- Hova dynasty

=== Mali ===
- Keita dynasty

=== Nigeria ===
- Abass
- Ademola
- Dantata
- Ezekwe
- Eweka
- dan Fodio
- Fubara Manilla Pepple
- Kanemi
- Nnama
- Nnofo
- Ransome-Kuti
- Sayfawa dynasty
- Olagbegi
- Olukere
- Oduduwa
- Oranyan

=== Rwanda ===
- Abanyiginya clan

=== Senegambia ===
- Guelowar
- Joof
  - The Royal House of Boureh Gnilane Joof
  - The Royal House of Jogo Siga Joof
  - The Royal House of Semou Njekeh Joof
- Faye
- Joos Maternal dynasty

=== South Africa ===
- House of Zulu

=== Zanzibar ===
- House of Busaid

== Oceania ==
=== Fiji ===
- House of Cakobau

=== Hawaii ===
- House of Kalākaua
- House of Kamehameha
- House of Kawānanakoa
- House of Keoua

=== New Zealand ===
- House of Maori/Te Wherowhero dynasty

=== Samoa ===
- Tupua Tamasese
- Malietoa
- Mata'afa
- Tuimaleali'ifano

=== Tahiti ===
- Pōmare dynasty

=== Tonga ===
- House of Tupou

=== Wallis and Futuna ===
- House of Uvea
- House of Sigave
- House of Alo
