= Ezekwe =

Family clan in Nigeria

Ezekwe, is the name of several Igbo families, most notably the Ezekwe family of Ezeawulu, Nibo, Awka LGA, in Anambra State, Nigeria, West Africa.

== Leader and descendants ==
Oke Ezekwem as he was known was from Umuaka Dike in Umuezeagha clan in Ezeawulu. One of the most notable leaders of the area (traditional ruler of Ezeawulu village who was at war with Nnama Orjiakor of Umuanum village) before the coming of the British in the mid-to-late 19th century. He married Nwaka aka Ododo (maiden name Ezealor) from neighboring town Nise, and had 7 children: Aaron, Nwaku Abia, John, Mgbafor, Mgboye, Phillip and Rosa. Aaron would become a chief police officer for the British in the Eastern Region of Nigeria.

Mgbafor (Selina) and her husband Joshua Nnama served as Anglican missionaries planting churches around Southern Nigeria. Phillip became the 2nd Igbo Doctor of Nigeria, graduating from the Old Yaba Medical School and the University of Glasgow in 1937, became a Gynecologist and eventually would be the Chief Medical Officer to the Federal Republic of Nigeria, a position he held until 1966.

The Ezekwe descendants are spread around the world, especially around the African continent, UK, and the USA, as distinguished notable intellectuals and professionals with expertise in multiple fields of study.
