= Ojiako Ezenne =

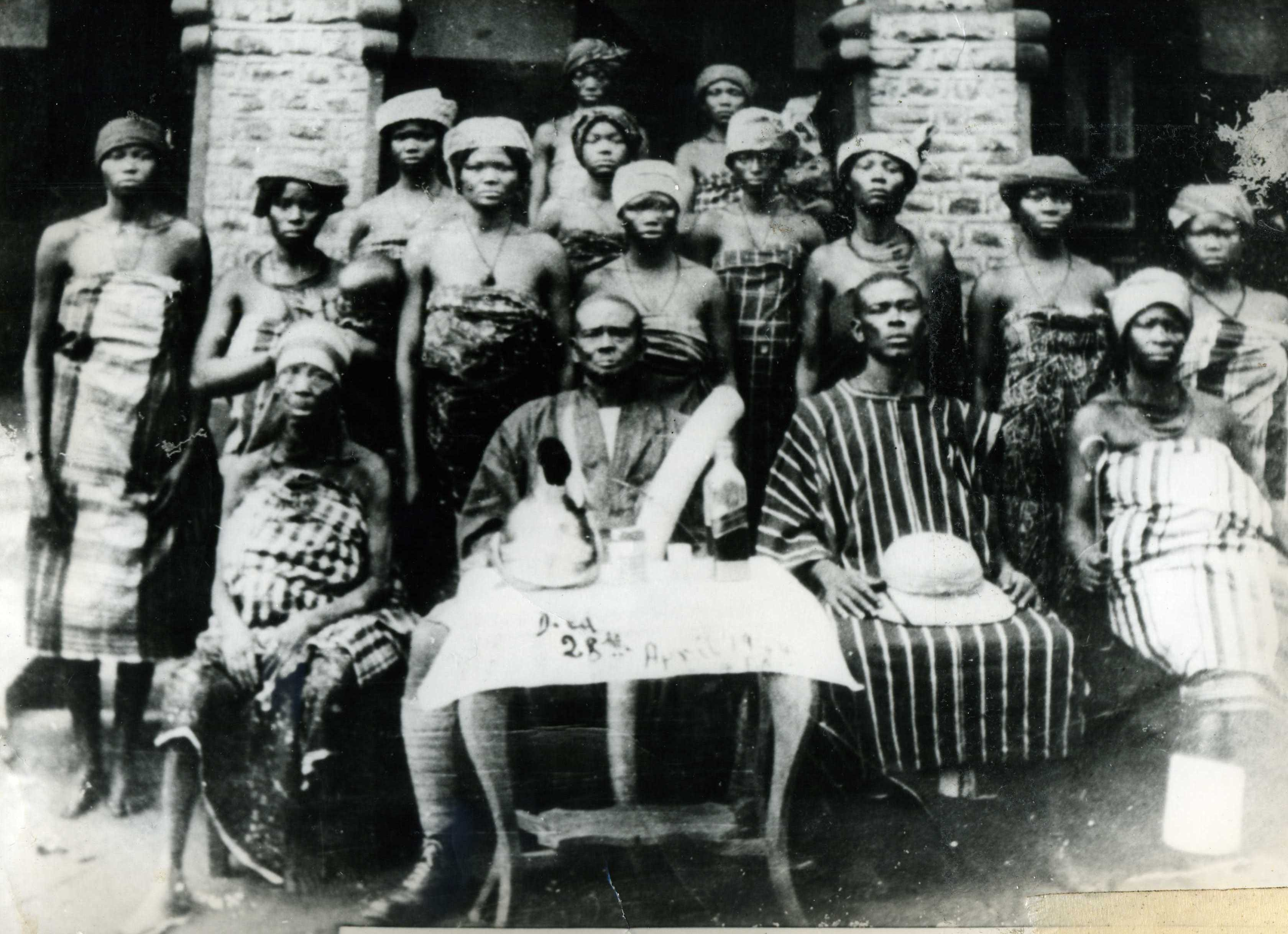
Ojiako Ezenne, circa 1913, (middle) with his wives. Sitting on his left is his younger brother, Nnoli Ezenne

Ojiako Ezenne, his brother Nnoli Ezenne, and Staff, circa 1903

Ogbuefi Ojiako Ezenne// (1857–1944) was a member of the Igbo tribe who was appointed by the Colonial government to serve as Warrant Chief (1914–1921) and then Paramount Chief (1921–1944), of Adazi-Nnukwu, now part of Anambra State in Nigeria. As the new protectorate government, did not in all cases impose a new royal family on native populations, but recognised the ancient ruling families based on Ofo seniority across villages, Ojiako Ezenne as the holder of the Ofo Ozo Okpalaekili, the oldest Ozo title in Adazi-Nnukwu, became the first African to serve as President of the Agulu Customary Court in 1914, having already served as clan chief between 1907 and 1914 of Amolu Clan, the senior clan in Adazi-Nnukwu. Ojiako Ezenne was a contemporary of Warrant Chiefs such as Muoyekwu Onyiuke of Nimo, Amobi of Ogidi and Nnama Orjiakor of Nibo. Identified by the Colonial Distinct Office, as serving with an excellent record, Ojiako Ezenne on February 1, 1915, chaired the meeting of forty-five Warrant Chiefs in South-East Nigeria that enacted laws terminating the practice of slavery in South-East Nigeria, thus pitting him in direct confrontation with the Aro confederacy.

Ojiako Ezenne had more than 37 wives and was survived by 86 children. Among his children were Okamigbo Ojiako who served as the second Igwe of Adazi-Nnukwu. Another son, Obudume Ojiako, served as the third Igwe (Adama) of Adazi-Nnukwu. A sister, Mbafo Ezenne, was married to the late Amanyanabo Owokori VII of Abonnema. He was also a brother-in-law to the Aro politician Igwegbe Odum.
