= Gérard, Lord of Ham =

Gérard
- Lord of Ham
- Successor: Eudes II
- Died: After 1144
- Noble family: Second House of Ham
- Spouse: Marguerite
- Father: Eudes I

Gérard of Ham (–after 1144), Lord of Ham, was the son of Eudes I, Lord of Ham. He was the first Lord of Ham to use the armorial attested to his House.

Gérard married to Marguerite. The marriage was childless and Gérard was succeeded by his nephew, Eudes II.

Coat of Arms of Gérard, Lord of Ham.
