= House of Ham =

Picardy noble family

- Arms of the House of Ham
- Founded: First House: 10th Century Second House: 12th Century
- Estate: Château de Ham
- Dissolution: First House: 12th Century Second House: 15th Century

The House of Ham was an ancient noble family from Picardy whose power was reinforced by a castle whose existence is attested in the 10th century.

== Origins ==
Ham is located in Santerre, on the eastern edge of the Somme department with that of Aisne. Le château de Ham is mentioned from the 10th century, then held by a lord of the House of Ponthieu.

== First House of Ham ==
The oldest lord of Ham is a certain Erard I, son of Count Helgaud de Ponthieu. He was still lord of Ham in 932 when Count Herbert II of Vermandois besieged and then took the castle of Ham. Herbert II used the citadel as a base to devastate the regions of Noyon and Soissons. It is very likely that the castle of Ham remained in the possession of the counts of Vermandois for some generations.

No period document gives it any posterity, but this has not prevented not very rigorous historians from asserting the existence of a House of Ham from Erard I who held Ham for two generations, before extinguishing in the person of Pavie of Ham (Note: According to these genealogies, she would be the wife of Otto of Vermandois. But in the current state of knowledge on the Picardy nobility of the year 1000, nothing allows us to make the slightest hypothesis on the origin of Pavie, wife of Otto de Vermandois. cf. Christian Settipani, Ibid.).

== Second House of Ham ==
A second house of Ham appeared with certainty at the beginning of the 12th century in the person of Eudes/Otto, Lord of Ham cited in 1106 and in 1144. The origin of Eudes is not known.

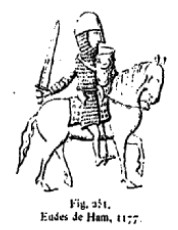
Seal of Eudes/Otto of Ham (1177)

The lords of this house were:

- Eudes I, cited in 1106 and 1144.
- Gérard, cited 1182, son of Eudes I, married to Marguerite. He is the first lord to wear the family coat of arms.
- Eudes II, nephew of the previous lord, son of Lancelin of Ham, died in 1234 and married to Isabelle de Bethancourt. He had the castle rebuilt in stones.
- Eudes III, son of the previous lord, cited in 1260, married to Helvis, Lady of Catheu.
- Jean I, son of the previous lord.
- Eudes IV, son of the previous lord, cited in 1326, married to Isabelle of Heilly.
- Jean II, son of the previous lord, died in 1344.
- Jean III, son of the previous lord, married in 1362 to Marie of Pottes.
- Jeanne, daughter of the previous lord, cited in 1380.
- Marie, sister of the previous lady.

Marie married to Enguerrand VII, Lord of Coucy. After her death, the Lordship was hold by her descendants, the Lords of Coucy.

From the House of Coucy, the Lordship of Ham passed to the House of Orleans, Bar, Luxembourg then Boubon-Vendôme, until Henri IV inherited it and united it to the Crownlands.

== See also ==
- Liste des seigneurs de Ham
- Ham (Somme)
- Château de Ham
