= Vinseum – Catalan Wine Cultures Museum =

Wine museum in Barcelona

Coordinates: 41°20′48″N 1°41′49″E

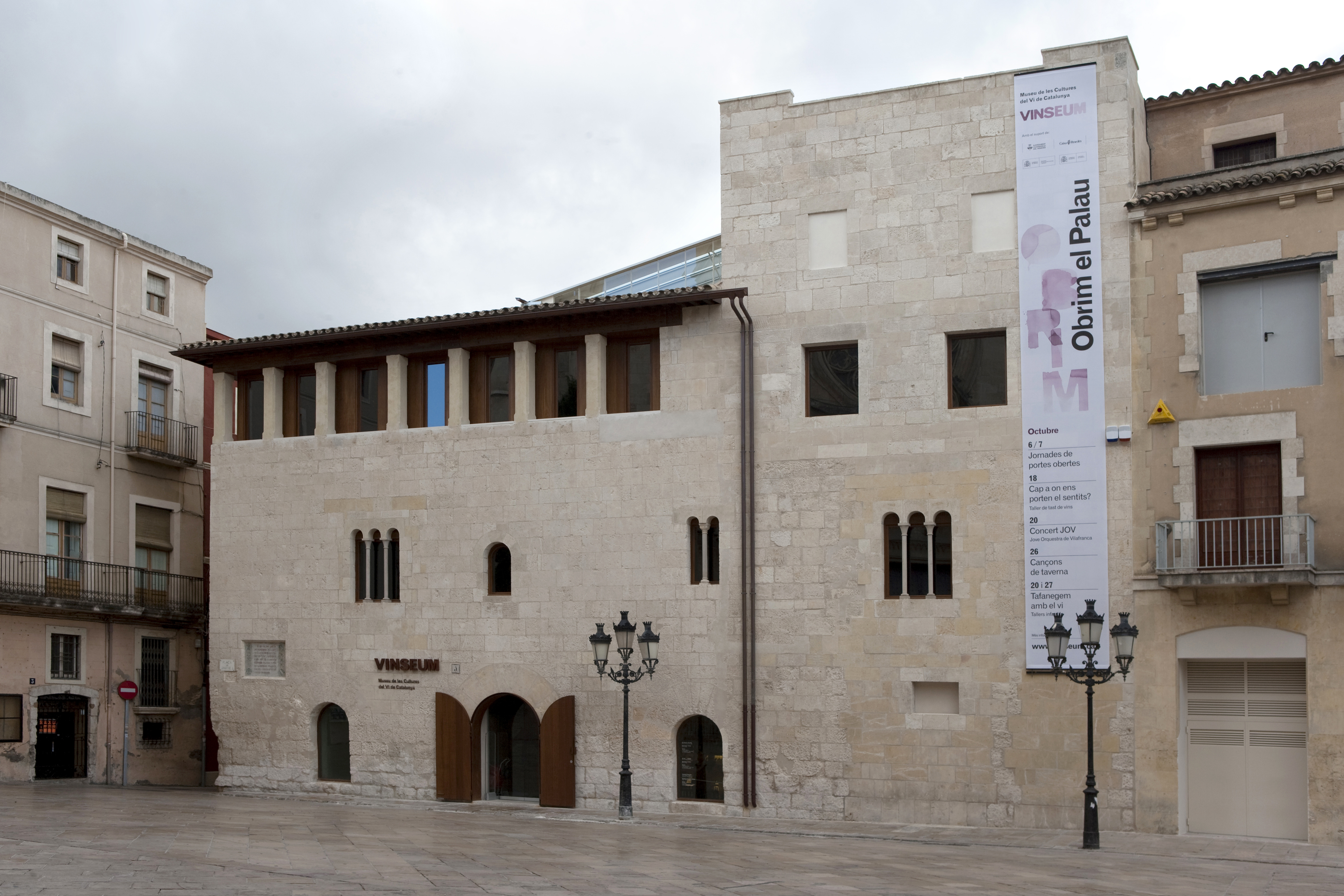
VINSEUM (Royal Palace in Vilafranca del Penedès)

The Catalan Wine Cultures Museum or VINSEUM is a museum situated in an antique house-palace of the monarchs of the Crown of Aragon, in Vilafranca del Penedès (Alt Penedès) Barcelona, Spain. It was formerly known as the Vilafranca del Penedès Museum.

== Museum ==
The museum owns an extensive collection, with tools and instruments both ancient and modern, mock-ups and authentic models that reflect how evolving technology has been applied to vine growing and wine making. Diverse dioramas of the wine cellars and taverns of Egypt and Rome, as well as the cellar of Poblet Monastery, are also part of the collection. In addition to that related to vine growing and wine making, there are also art, geology, palaeontology, ornithology and archaeology collections. VINSEUM also has a documentation centre on the world of wine and a plastic arts collection where wine takes centre stage, with notable copies of classic artists.

== Buildings ==
The main building is an antique Medieval palace belonging to the monarchs of the Crown of Aragon, built between the 12th and 13th centuries, which subsequently underwent major alterations. It was purchased by the Vilafranca Town Council in 1936 to Álvarez-Cuevas family to house the museum. Right beside it is Cal Pa i Figues, a building purchased later one for the Museum and rebuilt completely between 1966 and 1975. The Gothic chapel of Sant Pelegrí, adjoining that building, has been renovated as an exhibition room for temporary exhibitions. At the building on Carrer de la Palma, number 24, five minutes from the Royal Palace, the museum has installed a Vine and Wine Documentation Centre and the rest of the archives.

== See also ==
- List of food and beverage museums
