= House of Montmirail =

French noble family

Coat of Arms of the House of Montmirail.

The House of Montmirail is a French noble family from the Middle Ages, originally from the village of Montmirail, in the County of Champagne, and was a vassal of the Count of Champagne.

== History ==
The family of Montmirail originated in the 11th century. Some 19th century historians say that this family originates from the Île-de-France where a man named Gaucher, who had become the owner of estates in Brie, built a fort, Le Fort de Gaucher or La Ferté-Gaucher. Neighbour of the properties of the counts of Meaux, he aligned with the count, probably Theobald III of Troyes, and request a marriage to one of his daughters or granddaughters. The count accepted his proposal and gave him the land of Montmirail as a dowry.

== Genealogy ==
- Gaucher de La Ferté-Gaucher, semi-legendary character who would have been the first baron of Montmirail and La Ferté-Gaucher in the middle of the 11th century. He married either a daughter or a granddaughter of Theobald III, with whom he had at least one child:
  - Dalmas de Montmirail, an heir.
- Dalmas de Montmirail (or Dalmace de Montmirail), known as the first baron from Montmirail and La Ferté-Gaucher at the end of the 11th century. He appears in a charter of the Bishops of Meaux Burchard, where he attests that Dalmas and his son Gaucher donated an oven and a tithe to the Abbey of St. Jean des Vignes, Soissons. He married a woman named Agnès or Adélaïde, with whom he had at least one child:
  - Gaucher de Montmirail, an heir.
- Gaucher de Montmirail († after 1128), baron of Montmirail and La Ferté-Gaucher after his father's death. He gave to the churches and priories of Saint-Étienne de Montmirail and Saint-Martin de La Ferté-Gaucher, as well as the Molesme Abbey. He married a woman named Élisabeth, with whom he had at least two children:
  - Hélie de Montmirail, an heir.
  - Gaucher de Montmirail (or Gautier de Montmirail), at monk in the Clairvaux Abbey.
- Hélie de Montmirail († before 1145), baron of Montmirail and La Ferté-Gaucher after his father's death. He promoted the foundation of Notre-Dame-d'Andecy Abbey. He married Adélaïde de Pleurs, lady of Arcis, daughter of Jean de Pleurs, baron of Pleurs and viscount of Mareuil, with whom he had four children:
  - Gaucher de Montmirail, probably the oldest. Cited in a single act. Died young.
  - André de Montmirail, heir of the preceding.
  - Hugues de Montmirail, probably a monk in Saint-Pierre de Preuilly
  - Ade de Montmirail, who married Hugues de Saint-Florentin.
- André de Montmirail († about 1177), baron of Montmirail and La Ferté-Gaucher after his father's death. He married Hildiarde d’Oisy, daughter of Simon d'Oisy, squire of Cambrai, and Ade de La Ferté-sous-Jouarre, viscount of Meaux. He had two children.
  - Jean de Montmirail, an heir.
  - Ade or Ada de Montmirail, who first married Clarembaud de Noyers. After he died, she married Vilain de Nully.
- Jean de Montmirail († 1217), baron of Montmirail and La Ferté-Gaucher after his father's death as well as Oisy, Crèvecœur, La Ferté-Ancoul, squire of Cambrai and vicount of Meaux after his mother's death. He was also a constable of France and was beatified c. 1250. He married Helvide de Dampierre, daughter of Guillaume 1st, baron of Dampierre, and Ermengarde de Toucy. He had six children:
  - Guillaume de Montmirail, mentioned in 1203, probably died before his father without union or descendants.
  - Jean II de Montmirail, heir of the preceding.
  - Mathieu de Montmirail, heir of his brother.
  - Élisabeth de Montmirail, nun in Mont-Dieu de Montmirail.
  - Marie de Montmirail, heir of his brothers.
  - Félicie de Montmirail, lady of La Ferté-Gaucher, who married Hélie II de Wavrin, seneschal of Flandres, son of Robert de Wavrin and Sibylle de Flandre.
- Jean II de Montmirail († 1240), baron of Montmirail, Oisy, Crèvecœur, La Ferté-Ancoul, squire of Cambrai and vicount of Meaux after his father's death. He married Isabelle de Blois, countess of Chartes, widowed Sulpice III d'Amboise, daughter Thibaut V de Blois and Alix de France, but no offspring.
- Mathieu de Montmirail († 1262), baron of Montmirail, Oisy, Crèvecœur, La Ferté-Ancoul, squire of Cambrai and vicount of Meaux after his brother's death. He married firstly to a woman named Alise, and second to Isabelle de Villebéon known as La Chambellane, daughter of Adam 1st, baron of Villebéon, and grand chamberlain of France, but no offspring.
- Marie de Montmirail († 1272), Lady of Montmirail, Oisy, Crèvecœur, La Ferté-Ancoul, squire of Cambrai and vicount of Meaux after his brother's death. She marries Enguerrand III de Coucy, baron of Coucy, of which she has several children to whom she will transmit all her titles.

== Works in fiction ==
The character of Godefroy de Montmirail from the cinematographic saga "Les Visiteurs" is fictitious and therefore cannot be related to this family.

== See also ==
- County of Champagne
- Montmirail, Marne
- La Ferté-Gaucher

== Sources ==
- Marie Henry d'Arbois de Jubainville, Histoire des Ducs et Comtes de Champagne, 1865.
- Alexandre-Clément Boitel, Histoire du bienheureux Jean, surnommé l'Humble, 1859.
