= House of Fuenmayor =

Spanish noble family

House of Fuenmayor Casa de Fuenmayor
- Blazon: Gules, a cross vair ancient.
- Country: Kingdom of Spain
- Founded: January 30, 1249
- Founder: Millan Ruíz de Fuenmayor
- Titles: Lordship of Torre de los Escuderos (1368), Marquisate of Castel-Moncayo (1682)
- Connected families: House of Argote House of Falcó House of Gutierrez de los Rios House of Saavedra House of Sarmiento

The House of Fuenmayor (Spanish: Casa de Fuenmayor) is a Spanish noble house originating from the Crown of Castile, dating back to the 13th century. Its name comes from the town of Fuenmayor, located in the autonomous community of La Rioja.

The House of Fuenmayor (Spanish: Casa de Fuenmayor) is a Spanish noble house originating from the Crown of Castile, dating back to the 13th century. Its name comes from the town of Fuenmayor, located in the autonomous community of La Rioja.

== History ==
The ancestral home of this lineage was located in the town of Fuenmayor, which at the time was part of the judicial district of Logroño. Some of its cadet branches also settled in the town of Arnedo and the city of Calahorra, both in La Rioja.

The lineage also expanded to the city of Baeza during its conquest and connected with the Argote lineage. Over time, they eventually settled in the town of Agreda, where they held a significant inheritance. Some of their descendants also resided in the town of Yanguas, within the same province of Soria.

=== Branch of Baeza and Agreda ===
The progenitor of this branch of the house was:

I. Millán de Fuenmayor, Lord of the House of Fuenmayor in the homonymous town in La Rioja, was ennobled by Ferdinand III of Castile on January 30, 1249, in recognition of his military service during the conquest of Seville. Some scholars mistakenly consider him to be the brother of Miguel and Martín Ruiz de Argote, his grandchildren, due to confusion with their younger brother who inherited the House of Fuenmayor and was named Juan Ruiz de Fuenmayor, although he was also referred to as Millán Ruiz de Fuenmayor. This undoubtedly led to some authors confusing him with his grandfather, the aforementioned Millán de Fuenmayor. He participated in the conquest of Baeza, where he inherited property, and was the father of:

II. Juana de Fuenmayor, who married Juan Ruiz de Argote, with whom she had the following children:

1. Miguel Ruiz de Argote, who continued the succession of the main branch of the House of Argote.
2. Martín Ruiz de Argote, one of the prominent conquerors of Córdoba, who had no offspring; and
3. Juan Ruiz de Fuenmayor, who continues the lineage.

III. Juan Ruiz de Fuenmayor (also known as Millán and Fernán Ruiz de Fuenmayor) replaced his paternal surname of Argote with the maternal one of Fuenmayor, as he inherited his grandfather's estate in the town of Fuenmayor in La Rioja. It is unclear who he married, but his son was:

IV. Ruy Fernández de Fuenmayor, who was succeeded by:

V. Baltasar de Fuenmayor, leader of the squires of Baeza, who in the year 1368 defended the city against an assault by the Moorish king of Granada, personally killing the leader of the Moorish forces in one of the towers. For this feat, he was granted the lordship of the Tower of the Squires and the epithet of Ruy Fernández de los Escuderos. He married Teresa Rodríguez de Cárdenas, and they were the parents of:

VI. Juan de Fuenmayor y Rodríguez de Cárdenas, who perished in a revolt that took place in Baeza in the year 1417, leaving from his marriage to Mayor Alonso de Navarrete (daughter of Diego Cerón and Mayor Alonso de Navarrete, his wife), the following offspring:

VII. Ruy Díaz de Fuenmayor y Alonso de Navarrete, known as el Bueno (the Good) married Teresa Malo (daughter of Juan Malo), with whom he had the following children:

VIII. Hernando de Fuenmayor y Malo, husband of Elvira García de Arguijo, and both parents of:

IX. Ruy Díaz de Fuenmayor y García de Arguijo, who married Margarita Veraez y Peralta (daughter of Garci Pérez and Margarita de Peralta) and resided in the town of Agreda. Among their children were:

X. Miguel Díaz de Fuenmayor y Veraez, a native of Agreda, who married Catalina Camargo (daughter of Juan Gutiérrez Camargo and Catalina Malo), and from this union were born:

XI. Ruy Díaz de Fuenmayor y Camargo, a native of the town of Agreda, who married Maria de Miranda, a native of Soria (daughter of Jerónimo de Miranda and Maria Ramirez de Torres, both natives of Soria), and they became the parents of:

XII. Jerónimo de Fuenmayor y Miranda, a native of Agreda and Knight of the Order of Santiago, into which he was admitted on January 30, 1634. He was also a member of His Majesty's Council, magistrate of the Council of Castille, collegiate of Santa Cruz in Valladolid, and consultant of the Holy Inquisition. He married Catalina de Camporredondo y Río, a native of Granada (daughter of Antonio de Camporredondo y Río, Knight of Santiago and president of the Council of Finance, and his wife Margarita de Cevallos, he a native of Valladolid and she of Ocaña), and they were the parents of:

XI. Baltasar de Fuenmayor y Camporredondo, a native of Madrid, ambassador to Denmark, Holland, and Venice, Gentilhombre de Boca (Gentleman of the Royal Mouth) of Phillip IV, member of the Supreme Council of Flanders, and knight of Santiago, having received the habit on April 1, 1647. Charles II granted him the title of Marquis of Castel-Moncayo on November 5, 1682. He married Teresa Dávila, the fifth Lady of Blasco-Sancho of Ávila, who was a native of that city and from the House of the Marquises of Velada and San Román (daughter of Sancho Dávila, a native of Ávila, and Jerónima Espejo, a native of Madrid), and their children were:

1. Joaquín de Fuenmayor y Dávila, Lord of Blasco-Sancho, Commander of Castillians in the Order of Calatrava, to which he was admitted on September 13, 1688, captain of cavalry, and colonel of Germans in the Army of Flanders. He died in Valladolid in 1701, during his father's lifetime, without having married.
2. José de Fuenmayor y Dávila, Knight of Calatrava, captain of cavalry in the Army of Flanders, also died without having married.
3. María Lucía de Fuenmayor y Dávila and Jerónima de Fuenmayor y Dávila, both became nuns and joined the Order of Santiago in Santa Cruz, Valladolid.
4. Manuela de Fuenmayor y Dávila, who, following the death of her siblings and the religious profession of her sisters, succeeded to the family estate.

XIV. Manuela de Fuenmayor y Dávila became the second Marchioness of Castel-Moncayo. In 1702, she married Gabriel Joaquín de Saavedra Serna Quiñones y Pimentel, Lord of the Houses of Saavedra in Cáceres and a regidor (councilor) of that city, lord of the towns of Sena, Rivera, Grajal, Villaherreros, Casas de Sena, and del Rabanal, and Menino de la Reina (son of Gabriel Arias de Saavedra, Knight of Alcántara, and Antonia de la Serna Quiñones Pimentel). Their daughter and successor was:

XV. Gaspara de Saavedra y Fuenmayor, the third Marchioness of Castel-Moncayo, who married Antonio Sarmiento Sotomayor (son of Diego Saavedra Sotomayor and Maria Josefa Pardo y Figueroa). From this union, they had:

XVI. Diego María Sarmiento de Saavedra y Fuenmayor, the fourth Marquis of Castel-Moncayo and Count of Villanueva de las Hachas, to whom Charles IV granted the Grandee of Spain, of the first class, in 1790. In 1794, the same monarch granted him another Grandee of the second class. He married Maria Joaquina de Cáceres y Silva (daughter of Joaquín Jorge de Cáceres y Aldana and Juana Sánchez de Silva), and they had a daughter named:

XVII. María de la Esclavitud Sarmiento Silva Saavedra y Fuenmayor, the fifth Marchioness of Castel-Moncayo, a Grandee of Spain, etc., who married Carlos Gutiérrez de los Ríos, Duke of Fernán Núñez, and thus the title of Castel-Moncayo passed into their house.

=== Branch of Arnedo ===
To the branch established in this town belonged:

I. Pedro Díaz de Fuenmayor, mayor of Arnedo, who fathered:

II. Alonso Díaz de Fuenmayor, also known as Alonso Díaz de Arnedo, who was the father of:

III. Diego Díaz de Fuenmayor, who had a son named:

IV. Juan Díaz de Fuenmayor, resident of Zaragoza, who proved his nobility in the Royal Audience of said city on August 30, 1574.

=== Branch of Calahorra ===
From this branch of the city of Calahorra originated:

I. Antonio Díaz de Fuenmayor, a native of Calahorra and Prior of the Caballeros Hijosdalgo (Knights Hidalgo) of that city, who married Maria Caballero, also of Calahorra, and they became parents of:

II. Ruy Díaz de Fuenmayor y Caballero, a native and perpetual alderman of Calahorra, who married Juana de Salcedo, a native of Aldea del Señor, and from this union was born:

III. Rodrigo de Fuenmayor y Salcedo, a native of Calahorra and Knight of the Order of Santiago, in which he was admitted on November 6, 1628.

=== Branch of Guadalajara de Buga ===
The progenitor of this branch, Captain Alonso de Fuenmayor, was one of the most important conquistador captains under the command of the Adelantado Sebastián de Belalcázar. Throughout his military career, Fuenmayor gained the trust of Belalcázar, leading to his appointment as the executor of the Adelantado's estate, marriage to Belalcázar's daughter, María Magdalena de Belalcázar, and being designated as the successor to the Governorship of Popayan in the adelantado's will. Notably, he was chosen over the Adelantado's own sons Sebastián and Francisco. This is supported by the following testamentary clause:

Furthermore, I declare that since His Majesty has granted me the said Governorship and provinces for my lifetime and after me, to the person I name and choose; therefore, by this present document, I appoint, choose, and name by virtue of the said grant, as the Governor of the aforementioned provinces on behalf of His Majesty after my days, Captain Alonso de Fuenmayor, my son-in-law, and in his absence, don Sebastian de Belalcázar, my son, to hold, govern, and possess them in the name of His Majesty, to whom I entrust the loyalty that he is obligated to maintain towards His Majesty, under the penalty of my curse.

Captain Fuenmayor was the founder of the third city of Buga, and on August 25, 1551, he established the city of San Luis de Almaguer, successfully completing Vasco de Guzman's endeavor. Regarding the foundation of Buga, it is worth mentioning that the first settlement was established by Belalcázar, either directly or through one of his captains; however, that settlement was destroyed by local indigenous tribes. In 1554 or 1555, Captain Giraldo Gil Estupiñán established the second settlement under the name of Nueva Ciudad de Jerez, but one or two years later, it was burned down and destroyed by the Pijaos indigenous people. The third city was founded by Captain Alonso de Fuenmayor under the name of Guadalajara de Buga, possibly in 1559. He did so by commission from Governor Luis de Guzman of Popayan and located the town in the mountains. This third foundation was later relocated in 1569 by order of Governor Alvaro de Mendoza Carvajal to the valley, in a location near the Rio de Las Piedras. The relocation was carried out by his son-in-law, Captain Rodrigo Díez de Fuenmayor, Joan de Aguilar, and Luis Arronis de Berlangai. Finally, in 1576, with the authorization of Governor Jeronimo de Silva, Guadalajara de Buga was moved to the lands owned by Captain Rodrigo Diez de Fuenmayor and other residents, which are the lands that the city occupies today.

From the marriage of Captain Alonso de Fuenmayor and María Magdalena de Belalcázar, among other children, Isabel de Fuenmayor y Belalcázar was born in the city of Santiago de Cali. Isabel de Fuenmayor y Belalcázar married the aforementioned Captain Rodrigo Díez de Fuenmayor, her relative, who was born in Agreda in 1528. Captain Rodrigo Díez de Fuenmayor was a conquistador and maestre de campo, residing in San Juan de Pasto, where he served as mayor in 1545. The main branch of this lineage stems from the union of Captain Rodrigo Díez de Fuenmayor and Isabel de Fuenmayor y Belalcazar, and their son, among others, is:

I. Diego Díez de Fuenmayor, a native of Buga and maestre de campo, to whom the king granted lands in Buga for his loyalty and services to the Crown. He married Isabel Ramirez del Campo, who became the mother of:

II. Martin Diego Díez de Fuenmayor y Ramirez del Campo, born in San Juan de Pasto and maestre de campo, who married Jeronima Muñoz de Ayala Jaramillo (daughter of Captain Diego Muñoz de Ayala and Francisca Guerrero Jaramillo de Andrade), with whom he had:

III. Juan Díez de Fuenmayor y Muñoz de Ayala, a native of San Juan de Pasto and maestre de campo, who held various government positions, from perpetual alderman to lieutenant governor. He remained in office as the lieutenant governor on December 19, 1665, the day he made his will. On July 15, 1666, he resigned from the position of perpetual alderman of San Juan de Pasto in favor of Captain Sebastián Guerrero de Zuñiga, Joseph Tiburcio Guerrero, and Mauricio Muñoz de Ayala. He married his relative Manuela Díez de Fuenmayor and was the father of:

IV. Gaspar Carlos Díez de Fuenmayor, a native of San Juan de Pasto and maestre de campo, who grew up under the guardianship of his paternal aunt Petronila Díez de Fuenmayor, who designated him as the universal heir of her estate in her will, signed on December 19, 1665. He was a notable public servant, holding government positions in San Juan de Pasto and Santa María del Puerto de las Barbacoas, and serving as the mayor of the former in 1720. Díez de Fuenmayor divided his time between public service and work in the field as a farmer and rancher. He inherited several gold mines in Santa María del Puerto de las Barbacoas from his paternal aunt. With the proceeds from these mines, he acquired rural properties in the regions of San Juan de Pasto and Ipiales. Upon his death, he left the estates of Bombona, Moechiza, and Taquelán to his heirs.

== Bibliography ==
- Argamasilla de la Cerda, J. Nobiliario y Armeria General de Navarra, print, volume II, page 239.
- Argote de Molina, Gonzalo. Nobleza de Andalucía, print, page 251.
- Archivo Historico Nacional. Expedientes de pruebas de nobleza de todos los Caballeros de las Ordenes Militares.
- Armería Española, manuscript, folio 52.
- Barahona, Antonio, et al. Rosal de la Nobleza de España. 1690, folio 194.
- De Burgos, A. Blasón de España, print, volume II, pages 194–195.
- Diaz del Castillo Zarama, Emiliano. Raices del Pueblo Nariñense, print, pages 223–225, 334–335.
- Fernandez de Bethencourt, Francisco. Historia Genealogica y Heraldica de la Monaquia Española, print, volume III, page 281.
- Lozano, Francisco. Nobleza General de España, volume II, folio 310.
- Quintero Guzman, Miguel Wenceslao. Linajes del Cauca Grande, pages 320–327.
- Salazar y Castro, Luis. Historia de la Casa de Silva, print, volume II, page 141.
- Vilar y Pascual, Luis. Diccionario Historico Genealogico y Heraldico, print, volume III, page 117.
- Vitales, Pedro. Nobiliario de Armas y Apellidos del Reino de Aragón, folio 352.
