= Olukere =

Olukere of Odo Oja (Ìkere-Èkìtì) is a traditional ruler of the Ekiti town of Odo Oja, Ikere Ekiti in Nigeria, one of the largest towns in Ekiti-State. The Olukere dynasty go back to hundreds of years, and the title predates that of the highest ranking ruler of Ikere, the Ogoga (who came later but their dynasty became the ruling dynasty of Ikere). Due to the fact that the oral tradition was recently transcribed, there are many stories that contradict each other. Many monarchs has been crowned as Olukere, but no official list since they were not listed during funeral or installation ceremonies. The present Olukere is His Royal Highness Oba Obasoyin Ayodele Ganiyu, the Okomolese II, which major stories points him the 30th, Olukere of Ikere. While the Olukere claims to be the ruler of Ikere, the town recognize the Ogoga as the traditional King of Ikere. The Olukere was recently given official recognition by the government as a traditional ruler of Ikere as well.

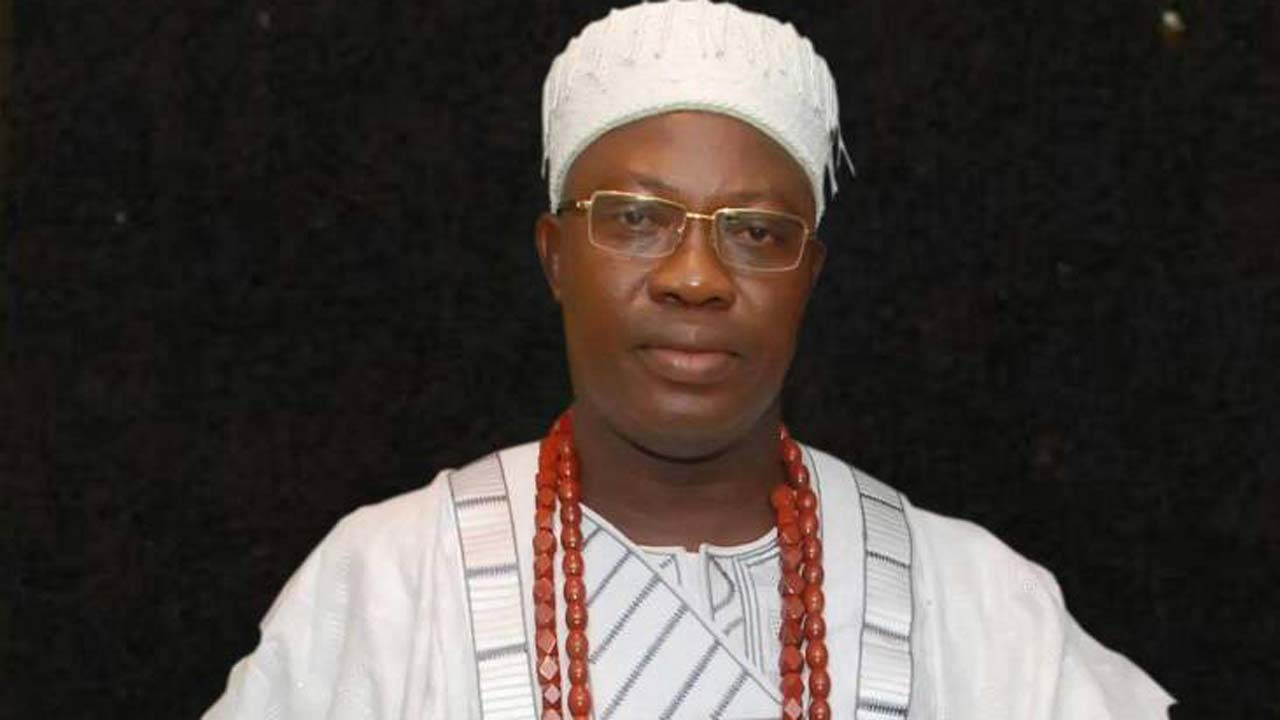
His Royal Highness Oba Obasoyin Ayodele Ganiyu, The Okomolese II, Olukere of Ikere Ekiti
