= Nibo =

- Location in Nigeria
- Coordinates: 6°10′N 7°04′E
- Country: Nigeria
- State: Anambra State
- Time zone: UTC+1 (West Africa Time)

Nibo is a town in the Awka South local government area of Anambra State, Nigeria.

There are four major villages that make up the town. In order of seniority they are; Ezeawulu, Umuanum, Ifite and Ezeoye. Nibo is a community of cooperative people who work jointly for the development of the town.

== Traditional institutions ==
Nibo operates rotational governance. The traditional stool, which is held for life, rotates among the four villages, though this was not always the case. There has been some dispute over who was the first traditional ruler (referred to as 'Ezeike') of Nibo between Umuanum and Ezeawulu villages. The ruler of Ezeawulu village was Oke Ezekwe/Ezekwem from Umuka while that of Umuanum was Nnama Orjiakor-Ele from Umuenechi.

Nnama Orjiakor Eleh was the ruler of Nibo before the coming of the British and was granted a Royal Warrant in 1896 by Queen Victoria of Britain together with other southern Paramount rulers such as Onyeama of Eke, Ojiako Ezenne of Adazi, Kodilinye of Obosi, Onwurah of Awka, Obi of Onitsha, Agwuna of NRI and Ukpo. Nnama was appointed the President of Awka Customary Court of Appeal (1898–1945), He also served as a Judge in the Provincial Court of Appeal for Onitsha Colonial Residency covering the Niger Provinces (what is now known as Anambra and Enugu States). Nnama was deputy judge in the Omenuko Court presided by the legendary Okoli Ijoma ruling over the old Awka province involving over 100 towns. He was from Umuanum village, which was at war with Ezeawulu and Ezekwe over the rulership of Nibo. After decades of war, peace finally prevailed when Nnama and Ezekwe decided that Nnama's eldest son, Orji Joshua Nnama and Ezekwe's eldest daughter Mgbafor Selina Ezekwe should marry. This appeared to be the best resolution, uniting both villages, at which point Nnama Orjiakor remained as ruler of Nibo till his death in 1945.

Upon the death of Nnama Orjiakor, his son Prince Joshua Nnama chose to pass over the throne to pursue his Christian work as a missionary in SE Nigeria. His son GCD Nnama was then given the throne. However, unfortunately, proper ceremonial rights were not done for many years. Nibo was thus officially without a ruler till the town decided to vote and pass the rule rotating rulership among the villages to make the process fair. Prior to that time, Nibo never had rotational governance. Onwuegbune from Umuanum Village the next in seniority was crowned in the 1970s, and upon his death Micheal C. Ngene from Ifite village ascended the throne and is currently the Ezeike of Nibo. Upon his death, the traditional stool will move to Ezeoye village, continuing the rotational order.

There is a Nibo Town Union and a secretariat, led by a secretary-general. The town union is the engine room of the town administration. They handle revenue collection, enforcement of rules and infrastructural development. Usually, town unions are organised wherever Nibo people are all over the world and linked to Nibo. The Nibo United States group has a website and is a very active group, with their annual Nibo convention held every third weekend in July in a preselected US city. For the first time since its inception, the Ezeike attended the 19th annual Nibo convention which was held in Minneapolis, Minnesota from July 22 through July 24, 2016.

== Nnemulu – Obodo women group ==
This is the women's wing of the town administration. This is a very strong organ of women that also enforces discipline among the indigenes. The Nnemulu – Obodo Society of Nibo” comprising all women of Nibo was founded in mid-1950s by Selina Mgbafor Nnama (née Ezekwe) signifying the emancipation of Nibo women as they gathered together to build the Nibo Maternity and Health Centre. In the early 1950s, Nibo had no maternity home and there were none in the neighboring towns of Mbaukwu, Nise, Umuawulu and Isiagu. The nearest maternity home was in St Faiths Church Awka about 10 miles away, the next was in Catholic Hospital Adazi about 12 miles and lastly Iyienu Hospital, Ogidi about 20 miles from Nibo. The implication was that most women delivered their babies at home using the expertise of traditional midwives. Those who could afford to deliver their babies in the maternity experienced unbearable transport difficulties as they were mostly carried on head or bicycles due to scarcity of motor vehicles in those days. In the early fifties, there was nothing like motorcycle service or "Okada" as it is commonly known today. A good number of women with breech births, facial presentations and other labour complications were not so lucky to make it to these distant maternity homes and hospitals.

Endowed with her indefatigable virtue, Mgbafor was in no way deterred. In an unprecedented rally at Eke Nibo, thousands of women gave her a standing ovation and endorsed her plans that a maternity centre should be built and that Nibo women will also unilaterally enforce the control of cows and bulls which wander around the town and feeding on agricultural farms, by literally "holding the bulls by the horns" and fining the owners 3 British pounds, an amount which at 1954 prices could buy three modern bicycles and was enough to pay three months' salary of a grade two teacher. Nibo women elected notable ladies of blessed memories such as the late Nwangbafor Agubalu, a renowned traditional midwife from Ezeawulu, the late Mrs. Okeke from Umuanum, the late Mrs. Pricillia Okafor, a renowned bread baker from Ifite and the late Mrs. Chine from Ezeoye to assist Chief Mrs. Selina Nnama in co-coordinating the activities and programs of Nnemuluobodo Society. The Nibo United States group is currently undergoing a project that involves expanding the Maternity Centre and donations are being accepted.

== Festivals ==
Nibo has various traditional festivals which include Onwa Asa (New Yam festival), Onwa Asato, Nibo Carnival, an event that focuses on emerging traditions, showcasing local and international talents in music, arts, pageantry, and games. The carnival which began in 2016, runs from the 23rd of December to the 25th of December. And Ezeike Day, formerly called Nibo Day, follows the carnival. Ezeike Day is usually presided over by the Ezeike-in-council. It is a very important day usually held on December 26 every year. It is a day for recognition of prominent members and friends of the town who contribute to the development of the town.

== Northcote Thomas, the British colonial archaeologist and the Re-Entanglements Project ==
Photographs of Nibo's ruler, and Warrant Chief in 1911 Nnama, his kinsmen in Umuanum and Nibo (Afo Ngene Shrine, Obunagu and others) from 1911, taken by the British colonial archaeologist have surfaced. The photographs were taken by the British colonial anthropologist Northcote Thomas during the second tour of Southern Nigeria (1910–11). The remarkable archives of these anthropological surveys are the subject of a three-year project that Professor Paul Basu (University of London) is running. The negatives of the photographs are held by the Royal Anthropological Institute and prints are indeed in the collections of the University of Cambridge Museum of Archaeology and Anthropology. These photographs numbering almost 300, portray Nibo in a never been seen manner, showcasing its historical importance.
