= Golemović noble family =

Serbian noble family

Golemović
- Country: Serbia (Serbian Despotate)
- Estate: Pristina region
- Dissolution: 1459 (Fall of Serbian Despotate)

The Golemović family (Serbian: Големовић, known as the Golemovići, Големовићи) was a Serbian noble family during the time of the Serbian Despotate (1403–1459). They were influential during the rule of Despot Đurađ Branković (1427–1456).

== Members ==
- Oliver Golemović (Olko), was a Serbian commander under Đurađ Branković, kefalija of Pristina, later worked in the Ježevo estate of Mara Branković where he also died.
- Đurađ Golemović (Đura, Đorđe), was a diplomat and judge of Đurađ Branković, later chief at Pristina. He was sent twice to negotiate with Sultan Murad II at Edirne. He is mentioned in Serbian epic poetry as Golemović Đura (in Smrt vojvode Kajice).
