= Château du Grand-Blottereau =

Historic pavilion in Pays de la Loire, France

Coordinates: 47.2262°N 1.5107°W

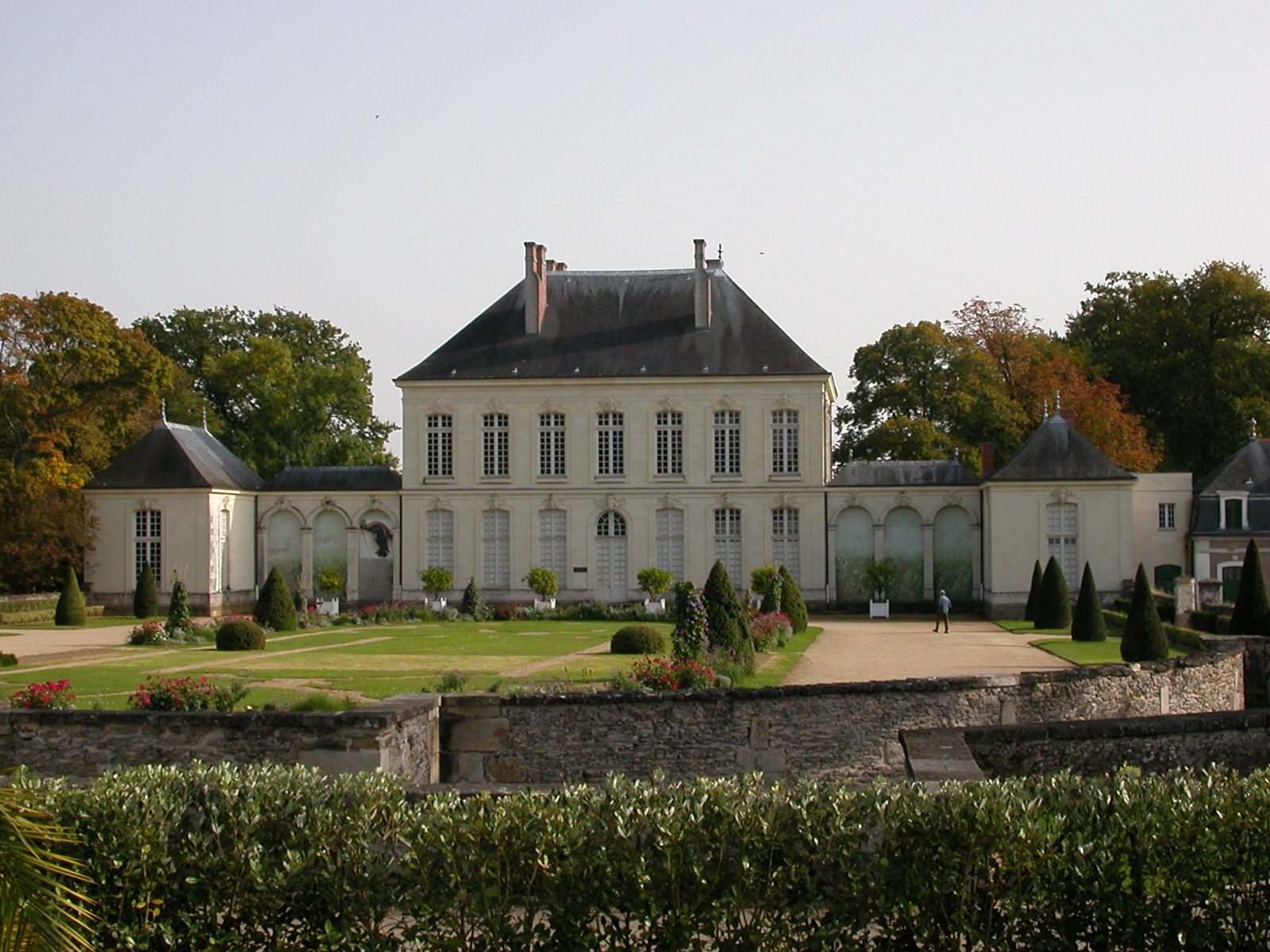
- Interactive map of the Château du Grand-Blottereau area

The Château du Grand-Blottereau is a historic pavilion in Nantes, Loire-Atlantique, Pays de la Loire, France.

== History ==
The pavilion was completed in 1747 to the design of architect Jean-Baptiste Ceineray, for Gabriel Michel, a Director of the French East India Company.

It was restored from 1988 to 1993.

== Architectural significance ==
It has been listed as an official monument since 1992.
