= House of Queiroz =

Noble Portuguese Family

House of Queiroz Casa de Queiroz, Quíros or Queirós
- Portuguese-Spanish Noble Family
- Country: Kingdom of Asturias Kingdom of Portugal Kingdom of Spain Empire of Brazil
- Founded: 9th century
- Founder: Prince Constantino, son of the Constantinople Emperor
- Current head: HH Prince Motthewz de Queiroz
- Titles: Prince of Queiroz: Count of Queiroz; Marquess of Queiroz; Marquess of Campo Sagrado; Count of Marcel de Peñalba; Viscount de la Dehesilla; Count of San Antolín de Sotillo; Marquess of Argüelles; Marquess of Cinfuentes; Marquess of Monreal; Marquess of Foz; Count of Foz; Viscount of Foz; Baron of Foz; Count of Cabral; Baron of Jundiaí; Baron of Limeira; Baron of Japi; Baron of Sousa Queirós; Count of Parnaíba
- Motto: "Despues de Dios, la casa de Quíros"

The House of Queiroz (Portuguese: Casa de Queiroz, Spanish: Casa de Quirós) is an aristocratic and noble family of Portugal and Spain. Founded by Prince Constantino in 846 in the nineteenth-century Astúrias, Spain. The Queiroz family has French and Asturian origins and is one of the most prominent and important dynasties in the history of the Iberian Peninsula. The house is also one of the 72 houses of the Portuguese high nobility, displayed at the Palace of Sintra (Portuguese: Palácio de Sintra) in the Sala de Sintra (English: Sintra's Room). The room was created by the King Dom Manuel I to organize the coat or arms of the most important families in the Portuguese nobility.

== History ==
Founded by the Prince Constantino, son of the Constantinople Emperor. The Prince established his residence at the Solar of Queirós (or Quirós), in Astúrias. The prince helped Pope Stephen III (720–72) against Desiderius (710–86), king of the Lombards; Stephen's gratitude was so high that he proclaimed the famous words, "despues de Dios à Constantino" and, therefore, received favors in the bishopric of Oviedo. In 846, in the Iberian Peninsula, he was welcomed by King Dom Ramiro I of Asturias (790–850). Tradition states that on a certain occasion, fighting against the Moors, Dom Ramiro was surrounded by enemy soldiers, when Constantino would have shouted in Greek "Isqueiroz" to the king, which would mean "rise up strong knight". With Dom Ramiro unable to fight, Constantino dismounted from his horse, gave the horse to the king and killed the monarch's enemies. After the event, Dom Ramiro would have started to call him Constantino de Quíros. From that moment on the motto that Stephen had given him turned into the famous motto "Despues de Dios, la casa de Quíros".

Later, Prince Constantino married to Dona Gracinda Bernardo, daughter of Bernardo del Carpio and Madame Galinda, daughter of the Count of Alardos, member of the royal house of France. From the father's side, Gracinda was the granddaughter of Count Dom Sancho Díaz de Saldaña and Princess Dona Jimena, sister of the King Dom Alfonso II and granddaughter of King Dom Fruela I and his wife Queen Munia of Asturias. Constantino had a son, Pedro Bernardo de Queirós, who continued the surname in Asturias, Castile and later in Portugal. His descendant Guterre Gonçalves de Queirós, seventh lord of the house and manor of Queirós, was second lieutenant of Dom João I (1357–1433), king of Portugal, with whom he was in the battle of Aljubarrota, in 1385, carrying the royal flag – the occasion when he had his arms cut off by the enemy, keeping the Portuguese standard between his teeth until his death. Fernando Álvares de Queirós, who would be Guterre's blood brother, was an Asturian nobleman who came to Portugal around 1378, during the reign of Dom Fernando I (1345–83).
