= Eudes II, Lord of Ham =

Eudes II
- Lord of Ham
- Successor: Eudes III
- Died: 26 September 1234
- Spouse: Isabelle de Bethancourt
- Issue: Eudes; Gauthier
- Father: Lancelin of Ham

Eudes II of Ham (died 26 September 1234), Lord of Ham, was the eldest son of Lancelin of Ham, brother of Eudes' predecessor, Gérard, Lord of Ham.

Eudes took part at the Siege of Adrianople (1205). After returning to Ham, he rebuilt the Castle of Ham in stones.

== Family ==
He married Isabelle de Bethancourt, daughter of Raoul de Bethancourt. Their children were:

- Eudes III, Lord of Ham
- Gauthier
