= House of Álvarez-Cuevas =

- Parent house: House of Álvarez de Canero
- Country: Kingdom of Spain
- Founded: 17th century

The House of Álvarez-Cuevas or House of Álvarez de Cuevas is a Spanish noble family.

== History ==
The House of Álvarez-Cuevas traces its origins to the Principality of Asturias, as a cadet branch of the Álvarez de Canero family. By the end of the 17th century, there is already evidence of a branch of the family established in El Puerto de Santa María, Cádiz.

Following the War of the Spanish Succession (1701-1713) and the accession of Philip V of Spain, whose cause had been supported by the House of Álvarez-Cuevas, successive members of the family served in the West Indies Fleet and held senior military commands in Cádiz, Veracruz, Havana and Cartagena de Indias, as officers of the Spanish Navy.

In 1734, Captain Francisco de Álvarez-Cuevas y de Pelayo built the Álvarez-Cuevas Palace in El Puerto de Santa María. Upon his death in 1738, the property passed to his son, Francisco de Álvarez-Cuevas y Banquero, who served as perpetual alderman of the city.

Toward the close of the 18th century, Juan de Álvarez-Cuevas y de Craywinckel established himself in the Principality of Catalonia, where his descendants formed matrimonial and family ties over successive generations. From then on, several of them continued the family’s military tradition, while others entered public administration and held positions at the state, provincial and municipal levels.

== Prominent members of the family ==
- Francisco de Álvarez-Cuevas y de Pelayo (deceased in 1738), captain of the Spanish Navy. In 1731 he served in the Mediterranean Squadron, headed by Admiral Blas de Lezo, as captain of the ship of the line "San Carlos".
- Francisco de Álvarez-Cuevas y Banquero (1706), perpetual alderman of El Puerto de Santa María (Cádiz).
- Juan de Álvarez-Cuevas y Banquero (brother of the previous person), officer of the Spanish Navy in the Viceroyalty of New Granada.
- Juan de Álvarez-Cuevas y de Craywinckel (1740), cavalry lieutenant colonel.
- Manuel de Navia-Osorio y de Álvarez-Cuevas (1806-1881), 9th Marquis of Santa Cruz de Marcenado, deputy.
- José María de Navia-Osorio y de Álvarez-Cuevas (1812), 9th Viscount of Puerto, brigadier, deputy and civil governor of Oviedo and Santander.
- Antonio de Padua (1812-1889), Narciso (1812), Felipe (1814), Francisco and José (1817) de Álvarez-Cuevas y de Tord, knights of the Order of Isabella the Catholic and of the Royal and Military Order of Saint Ferdinand.
- Felipe de Álvarez-Cuevas y de Castellví (1856), Infantry Captain.
- José María de Álvarez-Cuevas y Fuster (deceased in 1923), deputy.
- José de Álvarez-Cuevas y de Lacassaigne (deceased in 1929), deputy.
- Juan de Álvarez-Cuevas y de Sisternes (1873-1936), mayor of Villafranca del Panadés (Barcelona) between 1925 and 1930.
- Manuel de Álvarez-Cuevas y Olivella (1874-1930), deputy mayor of Barcelona City Council and member of the Organizing Committee of the 1929 Barcelona International Exposition.
- Francisco de Álvarez-Cuevas y Güell (1889-1945), businessman and art collector.
- María de las Mercedes de Álvarez-Cuevas y Güell (deceased in 1971), decorated with the Spanish Medal of Suffering for the Fatherland.

== Properties ==
Numerous historic buildings in Spain are or have been owned by members of the Álvarez-Cuevas family:

- Álvarez-Cuevas Palace, later called Bernabé y Madero Palace, in El Puerto de Santa María (Cádiz).
- Royal Palace of Villafranca del Panadés (Barcelona), current Catalan Wine Cultures Museum.
- Maciá Palace in Villafranca del Panadés (Barcelona).
- Penyafel Castle in Santa Margarita y Monjós (Barcelona).
- Álvarez-Cuevas House in Santa Margarita y Monjós (Barcelona).
- Villa Álvarez, later called Villa Florentina, in Sitges (Barcelona).
- Perelló House in Ametlla (Lérida).
