= Nnama =

Nnama is the name of an Igbo Royal family from Nibo, Awka South LGA, in Anambra State, Nigeria. Other variations include Nnama-Orjiakor. They are part of the Umu-eleh/ Umu ele clan (umunna) in Umuenechi, Umuanum, Nibo. This clan is part of the greater Umu-Nzekwe clan.

== Colonial administration ==
Nnama Orjiakor (Ojiako) was the ruler of Nibo for many years before being appointed a Warrant Chief and Paramount Ruler in 1896 by Queen Victoria of the United Kingdom during the colonial administration of Nigeria by Lord Lugard.

Other notable royal personalities also honored by Queen Victoria were Onyeama of Eke, Obi of Onitsha, Idigo of Aguleri, Eze of Ukpo, Agwuna of Enugu Ukwu, Onwurah of Awka, Kodilinye of Obosi, Nwodo of Ukehe, and Ojiako Ezenne of Adazi-Nnukwu.

Nnama was appointed the Chief Judge of the Customary Court of Appeal for Awka Province in 1896 and served in that jurisdiction till his death in 1945. He was also promoted to a Judge in the Provincial Customary Court of Appeal for the Old Onitsha Province in 1898. The colonial province of Onitsha covered the geographical area known today as Anambra and Enugu States of Nigeria.

== Royal families ==
The British did not impose new Igbo royal families but recognized the ancient royal families who signed the "Instrument of Surrender" as the Royal Niger Company and the Queen's Battalions conquered towns and villages in Eastern and Southern Nigeria.

Prior to the British conquest of Nibo, Nnama was the Deputy Chief Judge of the legendary "Omenuko" Court headed by Okoli Ijeoma (Ijoma/Ijomah) of Ndikelionwu (Ndike), a warlord ruling over all the towns in what is now known as Anambra State from 1856 until the British conquest of the heartland in 1896. Nnama sealed a lifelong blood treaty with this warlord in 1876 through the marriage of his sister to Okoli's 2nd son, Crown Prince Nwene Ijeoma (Ijoma/Ijomah).

== Surrender to the British ==
Nibo was the first town to capitulate to the British Army. Nnama sent an emissary to Okoli briefing him of the mighty military strength and arsenal of the British Battalion and informing him that the Nibo War council had decided not to wage a futile war but to surrender. Okoli sent a "flag-staff" message to Nnama and, after wishing him farewell, vowed that he would never be ruled by any other king: white, red or black. He kept preparing for war. After the "bloody massacre" of Agulu town warriors, Okoli continued to fight the British until his army was badly broken. He dressed up in his royal robe, sat on his royal throne and put himself down after drinking from the royal cup. When the British army arrived at Ndike, Okoli was gone at his word.

The British came to Nibo in 1896, officially conquered Nibo in 1904, and brought Christianity to Nibo in 1908. In 1904, Ezi Nkwo, in Umuanum Nibo, Nnama signed the official peace treaty.

== Northcote Thomas, The British Colonial Anthropologist and the Re-Entanglements Project ==
Photographs of Nnama, his kinsmen and Nibo from 1911 have surfaced. The photographs were taken by the British colonial anthropologist Northcote Thomas during the second tour of his anthropological survey of Igbo-speaking peoples of Southern Nigeria (1910–11). The remarkable archives of these anthropological surveys are the subject of a three-year project that Prof Paul Basu of SOAS, University of London, is running – see [Re:]Entanglements. The negatives of the photographs are held by the Royal Anthropological Institute and prints are indeed in the collections of the University of Cambridge Museum of Archaeology and Anthropology.

== The Nnama family today ==
The Nnama family today make up a large clan scattered around the USA, Europe, and Africa, including Nigeria. The ancestral home remains at Eze Nnama-Orjiakor Court in Umuenechi, Umuanum Nibo, Awka South LGA, Nigeria. The Late Prof Samuel Nnama became the Traditional Prime Minister of Nibo from Dec 2014 until his death in Feb 2016. He authored a book centered around his childhood experiences growing up in Nibo.
