= L41 =

L41 may refer to:

- 60S ribosomal protein L41, a human protein
- HMS Vega (L41), a destroyer of the Royal Navy
- INS Jalashwa (L41), an amphibious transport dock of the Indian Navy
- Lectionary 41
- Marble Canyon Airport, in Coconino County, Arizona
- Mitochondrial ribosomal protein L41, a human protein
- Spanish landing ship Hernán Cortés (L41)
