= Library of the Monastery of San Lorenzo de El Escorial =

Spanish library located in San Lorenzo de El Escorial

- 40°35′20.88″N 4°8′50.53″W
- Location: San Lorenzo de El Escorial, Spain
- Type: library
- Established: 1565

Other information
- Website: http://rbme.patrimonionacional.es/

The Library of the Monastery of San Lorenzo de El Escorial (Spanish: Real Biblioteca del Monasterio de San Lorenzo de El Escorial), also known as the Escurialense or the Laurentina, is a large Spanish Renaissance library founded by Philip II, located in San Lorenzo de El Escorial and part of the heritage of the monastery of El Escorial.

== Motivation ==
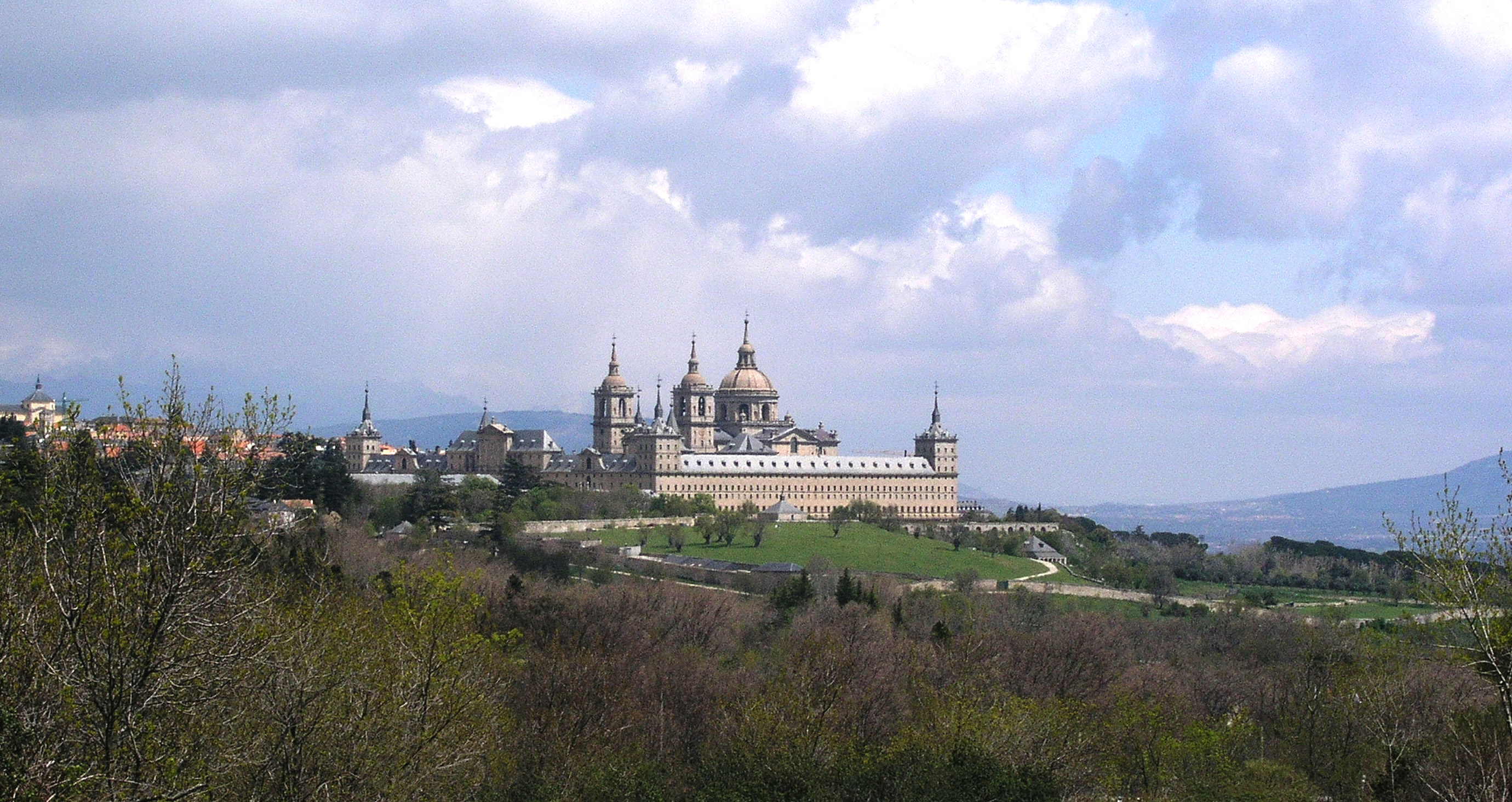
The Monastery of El Escorial, where the library is located.

The main reasons for Philip II's idea of establishing a grand library in Spain were the following:

- the humanist character of the king himself, a person with a strong intellectual formation, as well as a great bibliophile, who saw the impulse to build a library as natural. More recent historiography has coined the term Librería Rica (Rich Library) to refer to the private library of Philip II, which has been considered the embryo of the Escurialense or, at least, a great contribution to the funds of the latter.
- the context of humanism, a characteristic cultural movement of the Renaissance, which entailed the constant promotion of every intellectual activity.
- the need to establish the court in a fixed location.
- the work of the monarch's advisors, many of them were humanists who, with Benito Arias Montano at their head, marked the course of Spanish culture at that time. All of them were avid readers and bibliophiles, so they willingly advised the king on the policy he should carry out if he wanted to build a proper library.

== Formation process ==
The creation of a grand library in Spain had been in Philip II's mind since 1556, but the "transhumant character" of the Spanish Court delayed the project. Around that time, the king told some of his advisors, such as Páez de Castro, to gather books for a royal library.

As the court already established in Madrid, the royal decision to choose San Lorenzo de El Escorial in 1559 as the construction site was a controversial decision that went against the indications of his advisors, who were in favor of places such as Salamanca, since it had a university tradition and therefore a greater interest, on a general level, in books. In addition, the remoteness of the place with respect to the university centers par excellence of the time, such as Salamanca or Valladolid, was considered another problem.

The first books began to arrive in 1565. The first acquisitions corresponded to 42 duplicates of books that were already in the palace.

In 1566, a second consignment of books arrived, among which were works of great value such as the Codex Aureus, the Figurated Apocalypse or, perhaps the most important, a De baptismo parvulorum, by Saint Augustine, supposedly written in his own handwriting.

Over the next two years, the collection surpassed the thousand-volume mark due to the contributions of advisors such as the bishop of Osma, Honorato Juan. At that point, the library was a reality, and Philip II met with leading representatives of all kinds of disciplines to seek advice on the acquisition of copies. The tendency in those years was to acquire originals and antique volumes, since, according to the criteria of the time, this was what made a library "advantaged over others".

== Historical background ==
=== Philip II ===
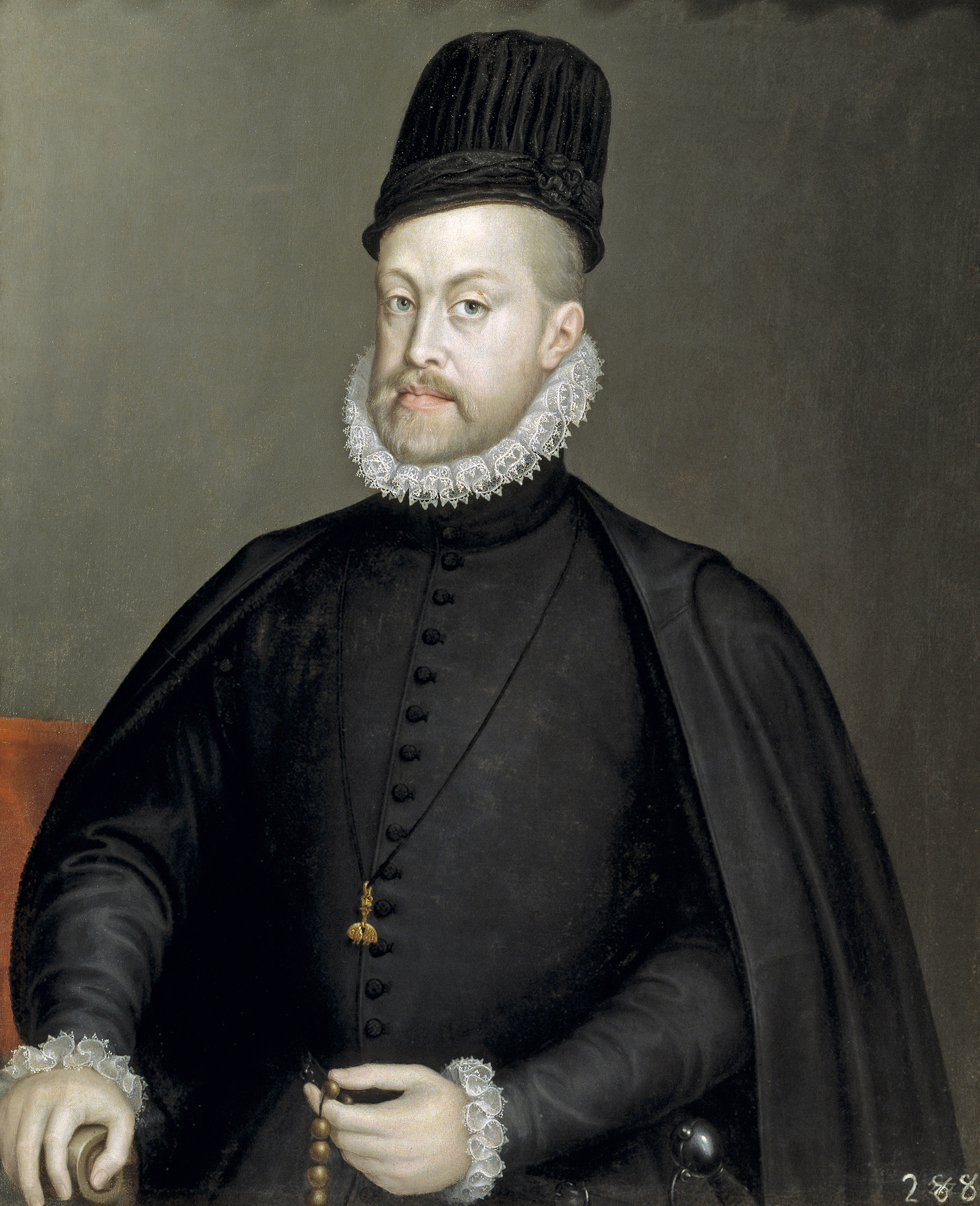
Philip II, the founder of the library.

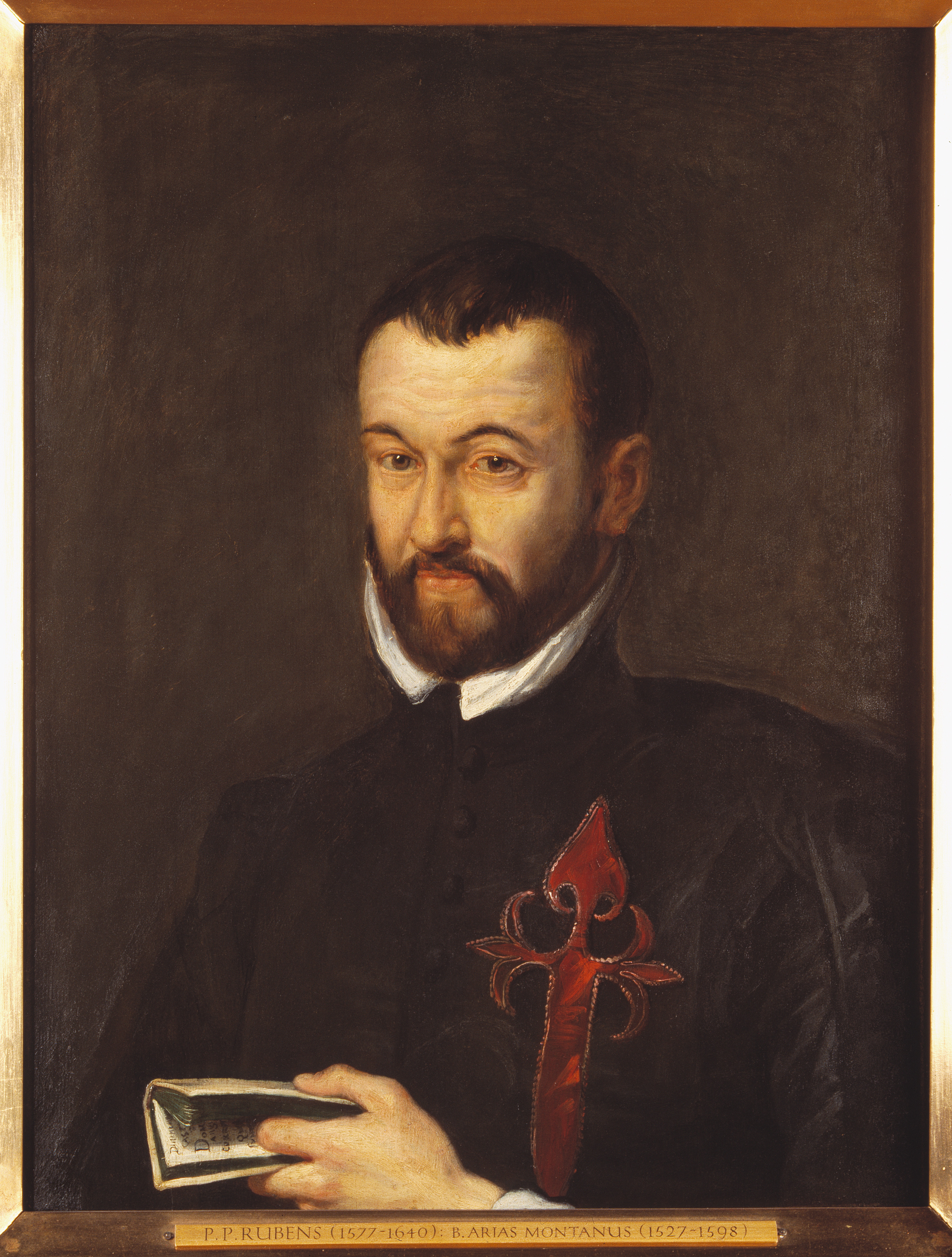
Benito Arias Montano

In 1571, part of the library of Gonzalo Pérez, one of the king's advisors, who had died five years earlier, was acquired after negotiations with his son. This involved 57 Greek manuscripts from Sicily and 112 Latin manuscripts from the library of the Duke of Calabria. That same year another of the royal secretaries, Juan Páez de Castro, died, and part of his library was purchased from his heirs. A total of 315 volumes were acquired, mainly of Greek and Arabic origin.

Since the Escurialense was at that time an institution of great prestige, the figure of the ambassadors arose, who were sent everywhere with instructions and purchasing power for the acquisition of numerous copies. In consequence, purchases were made from cathedral archives and monastic bookstores in national territory, while in major European cities there were emissaries in charge of acquiring renowned works. The work of the emissaries abroad was coordinated with that of the librarian/commissioner, since the latter was in charge of ordering and classifying the pieces that arrived at the library of El Escorial. One of the most valuable collections to arrive at the library was that of Greek manuscripts and Latin codices compiled by Diego Guzmán de Silva during his stay as ambassador in Venice (1569–1577).

In 1576 an inventory was made that collected 4546 volumes, including manuscripts (around 2000) and printed books (approximately 2500). That same year the library of Diego Hurtado de Mendoza was acquired, considered the most important in Spain. This involved more than 850 codices and 1000 printed volumes, most of them acquired in a commercial enclave for books par excellence at that time: Italy.

At that time the volume of the library was so large that it required the collaboration of Benito Arias Montano, who needed about ten months to catalog the works, arranging them according to their language.

In the early 1580s, the Escurialense acquired works of great importance. The first example was donated by the lord of Soria, Jorge Beteta: a codex of the Visigothic Councils dating from the 9th century. In addition, around 500 printed works were obtained from the library of Pedro Fajardo, Marquis of Los Vélez. On the other hand, books belonging to Isabella the Catholic were taken from the Royal Chapel of Granada, many of them of great beauty. Some, such as the Books of hours, are even sold today in facsimile reproductions due to their visual splendor.

The last decade of that century began with the purchase of the library of the canonist Antonio Agustín, one of the most extensive in Spain. Not all of his works reached San Lorenzo, as some went to the Vatican Library, but around a thousand copies reached the Royal Library of El Escorial.

=== Other Habsburgs ===
The 16th century concluded with the death of Philip II in 1598, who before his departure established a pension for the library so that it could continue to have a budget for acquiring books.

His successor, Philip III, continued this policy by enacting a privilege whereby the Escurialense would receive a copy of each published book at no cost. As for the increase in the catalog after Philip II, the dynamic continued to be upward. Arias Montano donated series of works, including some Hebrew codices, while Luis Fajardo seized a large number of Arabic codices in 1612 from Sultan Muley Zidan.

The Royal Library of El Escorial continued to grow throughout the 17th century and became a true symbol not only of the Habsburg monarchy, but also of the country itself. In fact, Philip IV personally arranged for the arrival of no less than 1000 manuscripts around 1656, most of them from the library of his illustrious valide, the Count-Duke of Olivares, who had copies from various monastic and cathedral libraries.

==== The fire ====
On 7 June 1671, there was a massive fire that caused great losses to the Library and to the Monastery as a whole. Although, according to the sources, the human effort to suffocate the flames was enormous, this did not prevent the loss of more than 4000 codices in all languages, originals and copies. Among the most important losses, which were many, were the Visigothic Councils, as well as the Natural History of the Indies – a 19 volume work by Francisco Hernández de Toledo.

During the fire, the procedure to save books was simply to remove as many as possible. Once the fire was extinguished, the codices remained piled up in the same room, and remained in disorganized for about half a century without anyone deciding to put an end to this disorder. Finally, in 1725, Father Antonio de San José was appointed as librarian, who spent a quarter of a century reordering, reclassifying and re-cataloguing all the volumes. In total, the new inventory provided the amount of 4500 copies as the list of items that survived the fire.

=== The 18th century: a change of tendency ===
With Charles III there was a complete change of tendency, perhaps due to the "before and after" caused by the fire of 1671. Whereas in the past the predominant idea was to accumulate works to enrich the Library, the 18th century society thought of extrapolating works from the Escurialense to enlarge its collection. In other words, the intellectuals of the time wished to disseminate the manuscripts found in San Lorenzo de El Escorial. Thus, catalogs were published on the collections so that the learned scholars would be aware of the volumes found there.

=== The 19th century ===
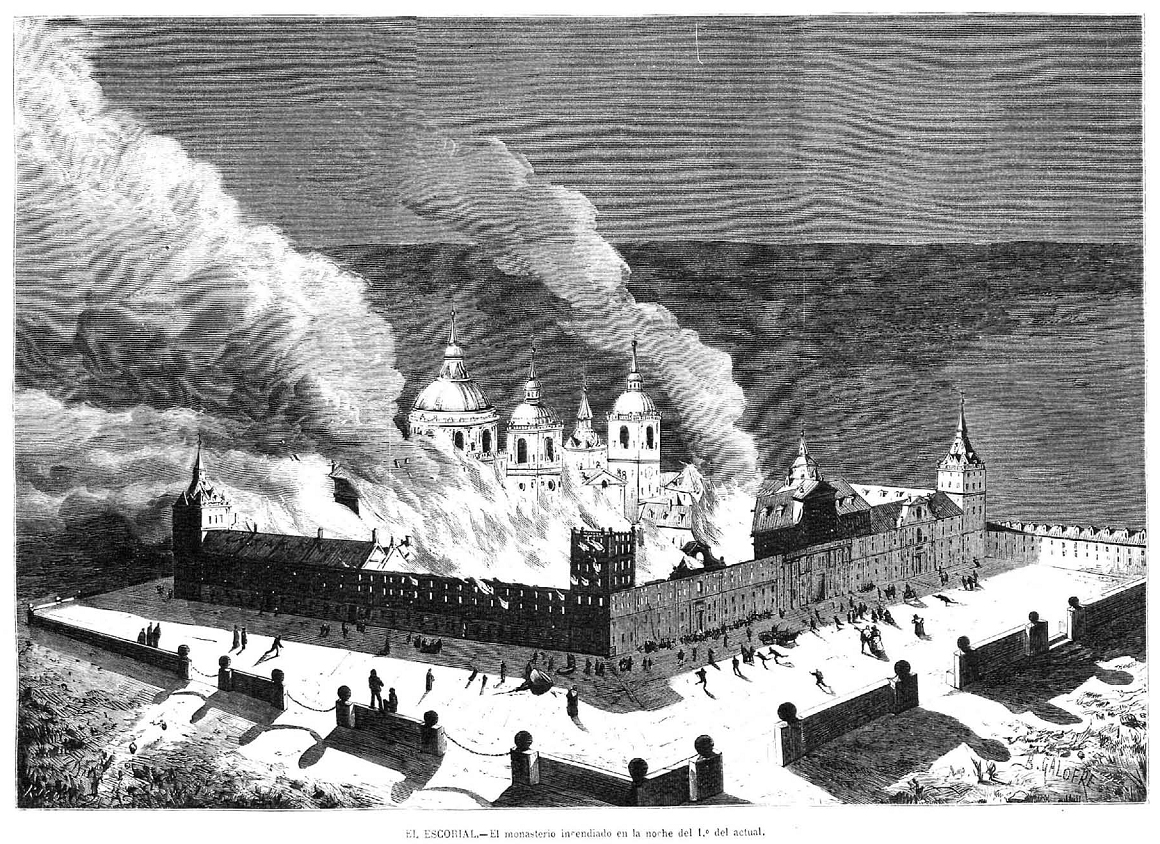
The fire, 1 October 1872, drawing by Galofre in La Ilustración Española y Americana.

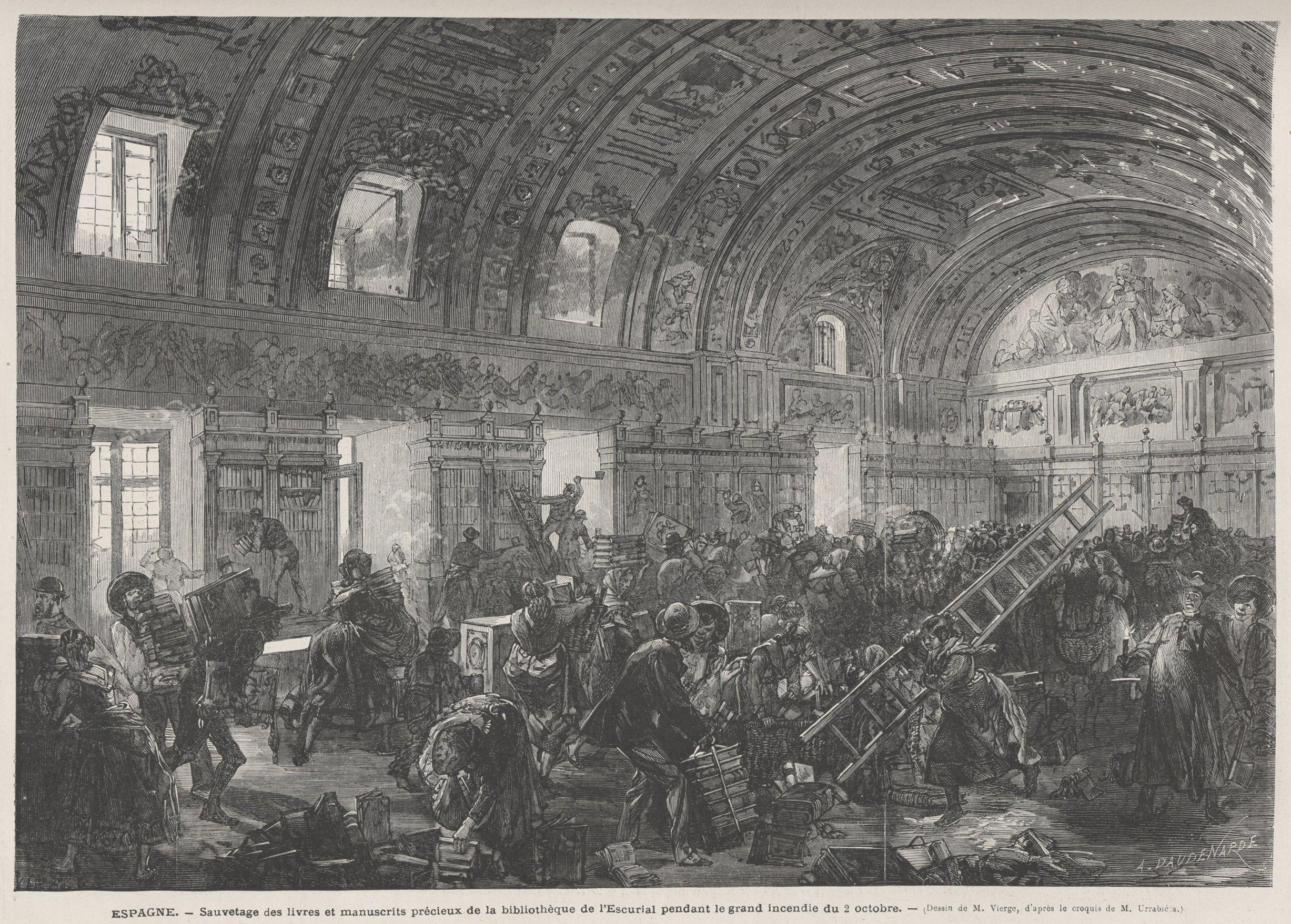
Salvage of valuable books and manuscripts from the library of El Escorial during the fire of 2 October 1872, drawing by Vierge, in Le Monde illustré.

The French invasion of 1808 constituted a danger for the institution -not for the works- comparable to the great fire, as there was a risk of a great diaspora of the volumes due to the fact that the French government ordered the transfer of the funds to France. This task was entrusted to José Antonio Conde, a supposed Frenchman who did not display such an attitude, since during the French occupation he hid the works in the convent of La Trinidad in Madrid.

However, in 1814 Ferdinand VII decreed that the works be returned to their original location, but many were stolen and lost in the transfer. Among the works that were no longer in the Escurialense were the Cancionero de Baena -purchased by the French government at auction-, the Codex Borbonicus -also acquired by the French- and two Greek Gospel books now in the British Museum and the Pierpont Morgan Library in New York City. Thus, when an inventory was made in 1839, 20 manuscripts and 1608 printed copies were missing.

From the middle of the 19th century there were constant changes in the selected people in charge of the library. In 1837, the management of the Escurialense passed into the hands of the Royal Academy of History. Until then it had been managed by the Hieronymite community, but the Queen Governor decreed its extinction. However, although a scholar was at the head of the Laurentina, the actual management was carried by ex-hieronomists such as Gregorio Sánchez or José Quevedo. In 1848 the Royal Academy of History concluded its work, passing into the hands of the Royal House. Once again there was a superficial transformation, since despite the change of organization, the position of librarian continued to be held by the ex-hieronomist José Quevedo.

The period of change did not mean, as might be expected, a stagnation in the development of the library. During those decades, much more exhaustive inventories were carried out, as well as beautiful rebindings. The acquisition of new volumes was not such in terms of novelties, but the main work was the recovery of works that were stolen or simply borrowed. Nonetheless, changes continued to take place.

During 1854, the library returned to the Hieronymites, as the order was restored for a short period of time. Management during this time was somewhat disastrous, as the work Descripción del Escorial by Juan de Herrera was sold for a small sum. Nevertheless, 106 printed works from Valladolid were recovered. In this period there was a fire, on the night of 1 to 2 October 1872, which, although not comparable to that of 1671, brought back old ghosts and caused some damage.

=== Current state ===
The direction of the Royal Library of El Escorial changed again in 1875, passing to the Royal Patrimony. For 10 years, the librarian was Félix Rozanski, a Polish priest who was in charge of restoring and consolidating old manuscripts. His work was also aimed at repairing the damage caused by the old fire, although his greatest contribution was the incorporation of Father Claret's library, made up of 5000 copies. In 1885, through a Royal Order, the Escurialense was entrusted to the Augustinians. They had clear orders to make an inventory and to receive and organize the incoming funds. The library, at that time, was already destined almost exclusively for researchers. In fact, a catalog of incunables was issued for the first time.

Throughout the 20th century, the Augustinians continued to publish catalogs to provide researchers with a list of the works found in the Laurentina. However, as time went on, the library began to carry out a completely different task, which is the one that is being carried out at the present time.

On the one hand, it is a focus of interest for researchers of all periods, both Spanish and foreign; on the other, the Royal Library of El Escorial is, in the 21st century, a place of tourist interest that attracts thousands of visitors to the highlands in Guadarrama every year.

== Structure ==
=== Main Hall ===
Main Hall.

It is the main piece of the complex; the sources refer to it as the "largest and noblest", and that is why it is known as the Main Hall (as well as the Hall of Frescoes).

It is 54 meters long, 9 meters wide and 10 meters high, and the most impressive, at least visually, is the barrel vault that crowns the room.

This vault is divided into 7 zones, each one is ornamented with fresco paintings representing the seven liberal arts: the Trivium (Grammar, Rhetoric and Dialectic) and the Quadrivium (Arithmetic, Music, Geometry and Astrology). Each of the arts is represented by an allegorical figure of the discipline, two stories related to it, one on each side (usually drawn from mythology, classical history, the Bible and sacred history). Those stories are complemented with four wise men, half on one side and half on the other, representative of each art. Finally, in the frontispieces at the end are represented Philosophy (to the north, representing acquired knowledge) and Theology (to the south, representing revealed knowledge).

This decoration was painted by Pellegrino Tibaldi (Peregrin of Peregrini), in Renaissance Mannerist style, following the iconographic program of Father José de Sigüenza.

As for the lateral parts of the Main Hall, the west wall has seven windows from which the highlands of Guadarrama can be seen, while the east wall has five large low windows, with stained glass windows and balconies, and five small high windows, all of them facing the Court of Kings.

The sides are adorned with a multitude of oil portraits, including those of Charles II -painted by Carreño de Miranda and placed there in 1814–, Philip II and Charles V -painted by Pantoja de la Cruz-. Sadly, during the Napoleonic invasion, Velázquez's Philip IV in Brown and Silver was lost, now in the National Gallery in London.

There are also some busts in this Main Hall, such as one of the sailor Jorge Juan. In the hollow of one of the windows there is a cabinet of fine wood, which is designed to store wood. It was made in the middle of the 18th century and contains 2324 pieces.

The four walls have a powerful bookcase designed by Juan de Herrera, the architect of the monastery. It has a classical-renaissance style, and is made of fine woods such as mahogany, cedar or ebony. Fray José de Sigüenza said at that time that it is "the most gallant and well-treated thing of this kind [...] that has been seen in a bookstore". In any case, the bookcase is on a marbled ivory plinth. It has 54 shelves, each with six pluteuses. From the time when Father Antonio de San José was the librarian, in the middle of the 18th century, the second of these pluteuses has a padlocked wooden lid, since it was common for courtiers to steal books.

The books on this shelf are found with their cuts facing outward, which may be due to several reasons:

- to show that the cuts are gilded;
- to break with the monotony of the cowhide of the spines;
- to read the title written on them;
- for the placement, since the spine is thinner than the edge.

Lastly, the floor of the Main Hall is paved with white and brown marble. In the longitudinal axis (from north to south) there is a wooden table, which is accompanied by five others of gray marble. In each one there are two bookcases with books, which were equipped with doors at the end of the 18th century. They date from the time of Philip II, and at first held spheres related to geography and astronomy. In fact, one of them is still in the room.

As for today, these tables serve as displays for the most important works of the Escurialense, among which are the Cantigas de Santa Maria, by Alfonso X the Wise, or the Figurated Apocalypse attributed to Juan Bapteur de Friburgo, Péronet Lamy and Juan Colombe.

=== Other rooms ===
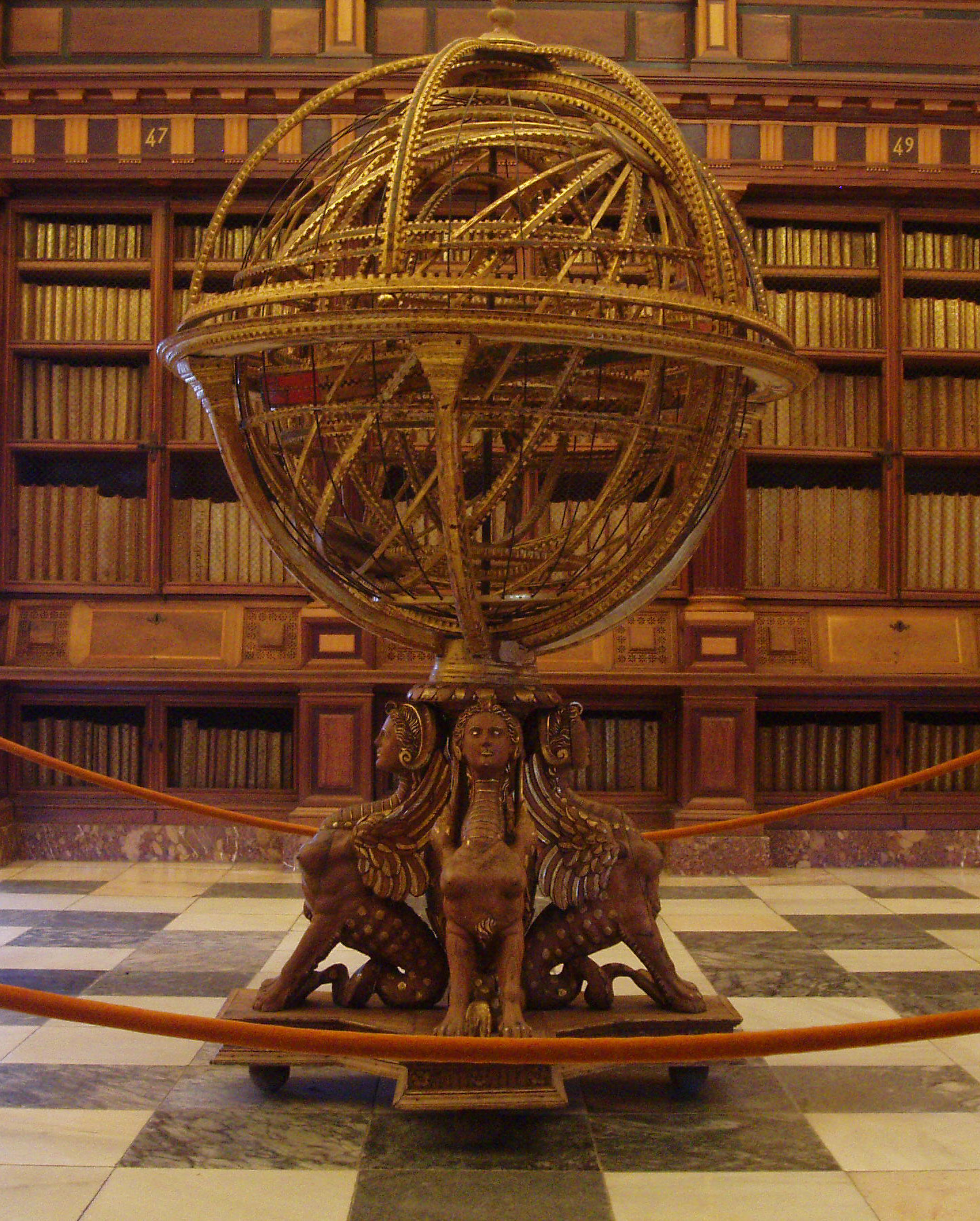
Armillary sphere of the Escurialense, built by Antonio Santucci; ca. 1582.

The rest of the rooms are spaces currently unused. However, in the documents of that period there are references to them.

In the first place, there are the high hall and the summer hall. Both are referred to by Father José de Sigüenza as the "two supplementary pieces" of the library. The first of these, the high hall, is known as such because it is located just above the Main Hall, being symmetrical to it. As far as is known, it contained "shelves [...] well carved [...], a statue of St. Lawrence [...], portraits of many pontiffs [...], terrestrial and celestial globes and many charts and maps of provinces", among many other things, in addition to, evidently, books. As a peculiarity, it must be mentioned that Sigüenza describes this room as very cold in winter and hot in summer, due to its high location. In any case, this does not prevent that, until the Main Hall was finished, all the books were placed there.

Once they moved to the great hall, the high hall had a multitude of uses, going from being a dormitory for novices to the place where the librarian organized the works, to the storage of forbidden books.

As for the Summer Hall, the second extra room of those that Sigüenza points out, it is located next to the Main Hall, being perpendicular to it. It is about 15 meters long and 6 meters wide, and has 7 windows facing the Court of Kings. As far as is known, this room had manuscripts of great importance. It was divided into two parts, to organize the manuscripts by language. Today it is used to keep mostly modern printed works, although the most important thing is perhaps the portraits in it.

Another space is the Hall of Manuscripts, the old cloakroom of the monastery. It is 29 meters long, 10 meters wide and 8 meters high, and just like the Main Hall it has a vault. It faces north, and was used for the storage of manuscripts in the second half of the 19th century. It has 47 shelves and three tables, and the manuscripts were moved there after the fire of 1671; this was the move that saved them from the fire of 1872, since it did not affect this room.

Related to the manuscripts is the Hall of Father Alaejos. Its main reference is found in his will, where he states that the room "was then a dark room like the bedroom above the refectory, and had even less the second light from the windows that go out to the attic’s side". The sources of the time describe it as a "library of manuscripts" or "hand library", since it contained codices of all kinds. This room was affected by the fire in 1671, and from then on it lost its value.

Finally, there is the Choir Bookstore, which contains the choir books used for prayer and chant in the divine office. There are 221 volumes, made of parchment from the skins of different animals, and they are distributed on a single shelf of eleven sections.

== Description of the main collections ==
=== Latin ===
The Latin codices are, traditionally, the predominant works in the Laurentina. At the present time, about 1400 copies are preserved, but in its period of splendor there may have been about 4000. Once again, the basis was provided by the library of Philip II, which, despite being only 9 codices, was of great value, as evidenced by the Gospels written in gold letters or the Figurated Apocalypse attributed to John Bapteur.

Little by little copies began to arrive, most of them coming from the libraries of his advisors. Thus, Gonzalo Pérez contributed works by classical authors such as Tito Livio or Plinio, while Páez de Castro or Arias Montano did the same. Another important contribution took place in 1571, when the monarch asked bishops from all over the nation to send him the works of Saint Isidore of Seville that they possessed to make a complete edition of his writings. Finally, as expected, the books sent to Philip II never reached their destination and remained definitively in the Laurentina.

A large number also arrived from Venice, including 26 alchemical codices. On the other hand, the bishop of Plasencia, Pedro Ponce de León, donated a great number of codices. Also acquired in 1572 were some manuscripts that had belonged to king Alfonso I of Naples. Diego Hurtado de Mendoza donated around 300 volumes, of which more than a fifth are preserved in 2007.

Before the death of Philip II many contributions were made, it was undoubtedly the most glorious period. After his death, although the process was not interrupted, it is true that it languished. During the 17th century, the main contributions came from the will of the late King, although in the middle of the century the Marquis of Liche donated a large part of the library of the Count-Duke of Olivares — which is, in 2007, approximately 50% of the manuscripts that are preserved.

In the terrible fire of 1671, some 2000 priceless works were lost. Along with this loss, as a synergy, the existing catalogs lost their validity, so that for a time it was not known exactly which manuscripts remained. Charles III, in 1762, took it upon himself to put an end to this and commissioned a catalog that took three years to complete. The collection of Latin codices suffered tremendously during the 18th century, because at a time of patriotic fervor, pages were torn out of some volumes, especially from De habitu clericorum, which contained opinions against the nation.

During the 19th century, the manuscripts were studied and detailed catalogs were published in line with the demands of the time. In any case, in 2007, the Latin manuscripts occupied 26 shelves of four pluteus, which represent more than 1300 works.

=== Greek ===
The collection that was found at its best period in the Royal Monastery of El Escorial comprised 1150 volumes, being one of the most important in Europe. In fact, the acquisition of Greek volumes was one of Philip II's major concerns practically since the moment he decided to organize a great library.

Thus, in 1556 a copyist was transferred to Paris who transcribed dozens of codices from various fields. This is how the first collection arrived, consisting of 28 manuscripts. However, it is from 1570 onwards that the rise of Greek works becomes remarkable. Antonio Pérez donated 57 of his father's codices and Juan Páez de Castro donated some of his belongings. Codices arrived from various abbeys and monasteries in the 1970s.

The Hellenic works were of such importance in the library of El Escorial that a Greek copyist was hired to organize and maintain in good condition the purchases and donations that arrived at the Laurentina. Diego Hurtado de Mendoza donated 300 manuscripts with humanistic works. Prior to the death of Philip II, the library was in full bloom, and the Greek works found there were a reference in Europe.

However, during the 17th century, the catalog hardly grew. During these years the work carried out in the library consisted of cataloging and conservation, and in fact the last known contribution, consisting of 52 manuscripts, was made in 1656 by Philip IV. The devastating fire that took place 15 years later destroyed 700 Greek codices, although more losses must be added due to thefts that took place taking advantage of the anxiety of the moment – which are now preserved in universities of Uppsala and Stockholm.

During the 18th century, attempts were made to publish the Greek collections, under the protection of the crown. However, during the war with France at the beginning of the 19th century, the Hellenic catalog was badly damaged; a complete scientific cataloging was not possible until 1885 –and was not completed until 1967–. In total, in 2007, there were about 650 manuscripts, occupying 9 shelves of three pluteus.

=== Arabic ===
The Royal Library of El Escorial was, at the beginning, an excellent possessor of Arabic manuscripts. The first ones were acquired in 1571 through Juan Páez de Castro. From then on, purchases were intertwined with works seized in various battles, such as that of Lepanto.

In 1573 a new series of works arrived from Juan de Borja, which are still preserved in 2007 . At the end of the decade came the great contribution from Hurtado de Mendoza, which included 256 Arabic manuscripts. In 1580 there were around 360 volumes, but since practically all of them were on medical subjects, Philip II made great efforts to increase his collection. This task was entrusted to a member of the Inquisition, who reviewed the seized works and incorporated some of them into the Escurialense. Thus, after the death of Philip II there were about 500 manuscripts.

In 1614 the Laurentina was enriched with the entire library of Muley Zidan, Sultan of Morocco. In total, 3975 books were revised and classified, and preserved in addition to the existing collection. In 1651, when the Sultan of Morocco asked for the return of his library, he was refused.

In the fire of 1671, 2500 codices were lost. Some of the most valuable were saved, such as a Quran seized at Lepanto, but the damage was irreparable. In 1691, when an emissary of the Sultan of Morocco tried to obtain the library of Muley Zidan, he was told that absolutely all the books had perished in the fire.

Morocco remained interested in his library and several decades later, in 1766, the Sultan's secretary was commissioned to go on a diplomatic mission to Spain to retrieve them. Some works were given to him as gifts, but the librarians of the Escurialense ordered the "good" books to be hidden.

In the 19th and 20th centuries there were hardly any new additions, but they did recatalog the library, which had not been done for quite some time. It is remarkable how many of the Arabic codices have survived till now, almost 2000 in total.

=== Hebrew ===
The Hebrew manuscripts formed, at their best period, a collection of 100 volumes, all of which were of important value due to their scarcity in Spain because of the persecutions carried out by the Tribunal of the Holy Inquisition.

The first collections entered in 1572, and among them was a Bible written on parchment. Arias Montano, a renowned Hebraist, was in charge of adding works in the library to the catalog of Hebrew, collecting ancient and very beautiful works. At the end of 1576, Hurtado de Mendoza donated 28 manuscripts, among them the Targum Onkelos. Around 1585 some more manuscripts entered the library, requisitioned by the Holy Office.

During the 17th century, the collection stagnated until 1656, when a large consignment was received from the library of the Count-Duke of Olivares. In the fire of 1671, 40 manuscripts were lost, which represented more than a third of the existing ones. After this, the Hebrew books remained for some time stored together with those forbidden by the Inquisition.

Throughout the 19th century, catalogs of these codices were published, especially in the second half of the century. In addition, the works of Jewish origin found in the Laurentina were the subject of various studies. During the 20th century, work continued on the cataloging and description of the works, until they reached their present state. They are found in a shelf of four pluteus, not reaching 80 units. The most important copy is the Bible of Arias Montano, to which reference has already been made.

=== Castilian ===
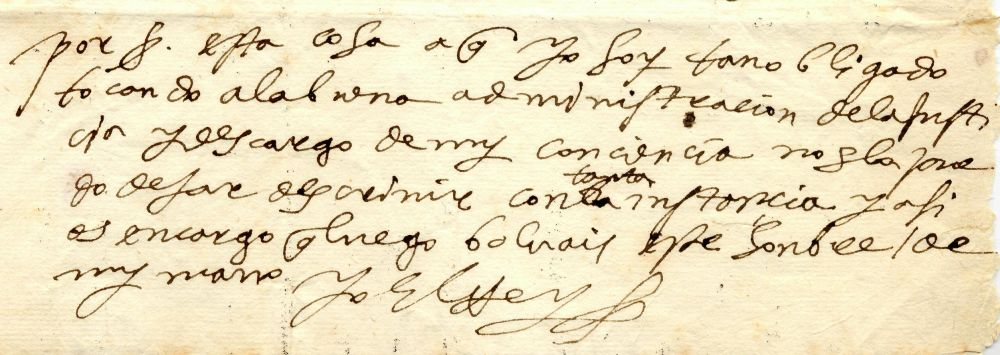
Manuscript of Philip II.

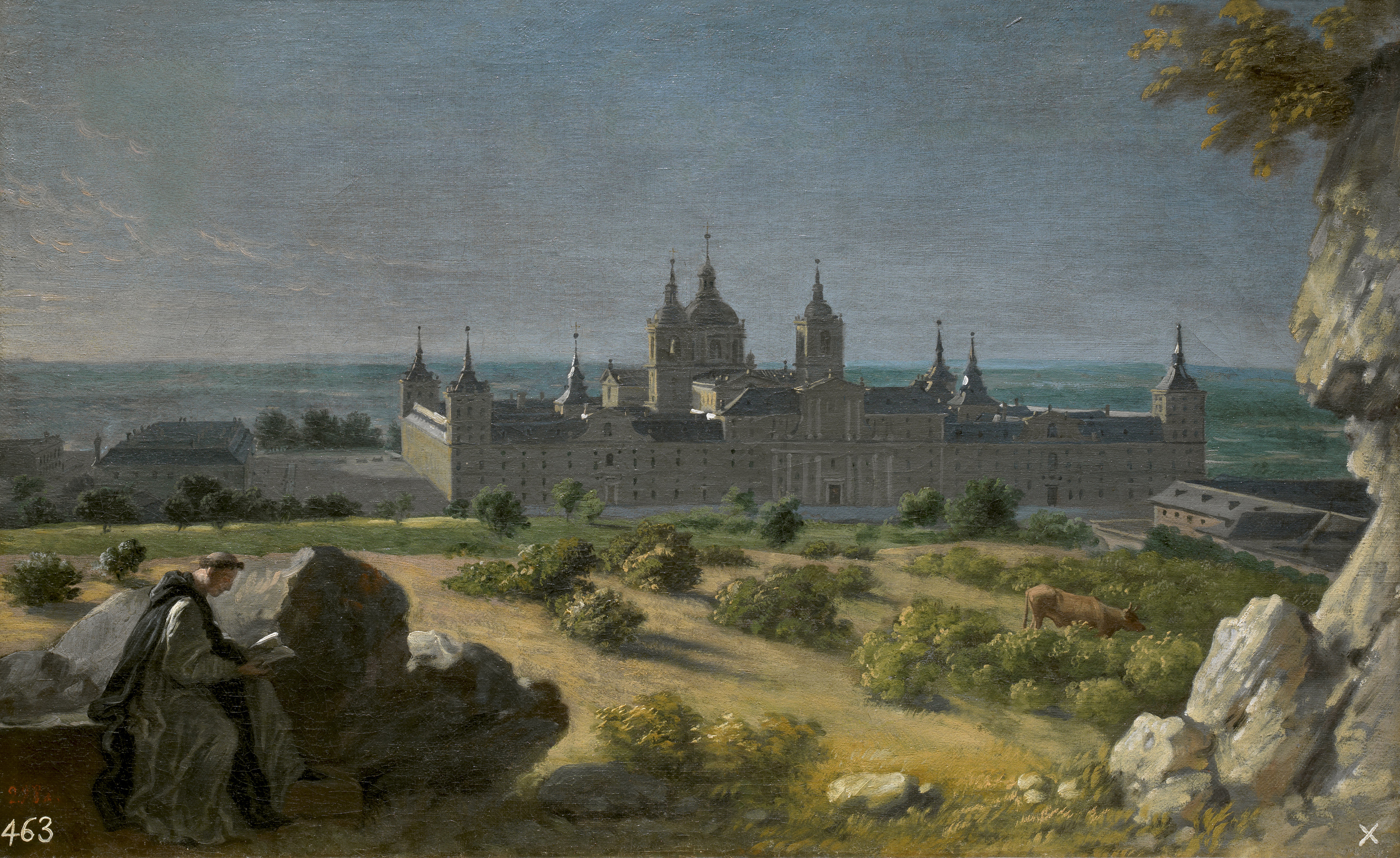
Monastery of San Lorenzo de El Escorial in a painting of 1723, Michel-Ange Houasse (Museo del Prado).

Following the trend of the Hebrew manuscripts, the Castilian manuscripts were not excessively numerous either, although of undoubted quality. Philip II kept in the library works written in Romance, in spite of the prejudices that existed at the time.

Because they are in the Castilian language, and therefore better known to the Spanish population, what is more important than their provenance are the works themselves.

At first, there were manuscripts by Francisco de Rojas, Juan Ponce de León, Antonio de Guevara –the latter of great value, such as his Crónica de la navegación de Colón– or Juan de Herrera.

From the "palace" came works by Francisco Hernández, Alfonso X the Wise and Juan Bautista de Toledo. In 1576, 20 Castilian codices arrived from the library of Hurtado de Mendoza, among them the Cancionero de Baena. In the following years, new works of Alfonso X the Wise arrived, as well as those of Isabella the Catholic.

The fire was just as devastating, in proportion, to the works written in Castilian. During the 17th century, there were few increases, the main acquisition being again from the library of the Count-Duke of Olivares. However, from this point on, the number of works in Castilian hardly increased.

At present the Castilian manuscripts are kept in the Hall of Manuscripts, occupying a series of pluteuses in this space.

=== Other languages ===
Of minor magnitude are the collections of works written in other languages, among which can be mentioned the following:

- Armenian: there are two other codices, one from the library of Hurtado de Mendoza.
- Chinese/Nipponese (Japanese): the collection has 40 volumes, all of great importance. They were mostly given by the Portuguese Gregorio Gonzálvez to Philip II.
- Catalan/Valencian: about 50 codices are preserved, among which the Flos Sanctorum from the end of the 13th century stands out.
- French: in the period of plenitude, they were almost 100, but in 2007 they do not reach 30. A Breviary of Love with beautiful illustrations stands out.
- German: there are two codices on parchment.
- Italian: about 80, mostly related to music – such as the commentary of Ars Amandi attributed to Boccaccio.
- Persian/Turkish: almost 30 are preserved, most of them believed to be from the Battle of Lepanto.
- Portuguese/Galician: there are only 15, but very remarkable. They are related to Alfonso X the Wise and Isabella the Catholic.

== Bibliography ==
=== General bibliography ===
- BENNASSAR, B., La España de los Austrias (1516–1700), 1.ª Edición, Barcelona: Editorial Crítica, 2001, pp. 9–30, ISBN 84-8432-221-1
- MUÑOZ COSME, A., Los espacios del saber. Historia de la arquitectura de las bibliotecas, 1.ª Edición, Gijón: Ediciones Tarea, 2004, pp. 91–95, ISBN 84-9704-102-X

=== Monographies ===
- BOUZA, F. y CHECA, F., Cultura, ciencia, tecnología, en BOUZA, F. y CHECA, F. (coords.), El Escorial. Biografía de una época. La historia, 1.ª Edición, Madrid: Fundación para el apoyo de la cultura, 1986, pp. 219–225, DL: M-35693-1986.
- CHECA CREMADES, J. L., La encuadernación renacentista en la Biblioteca del Monasterio de El Escorial, 1.ª Edición, Madrid: Ollero & Ramos, 1998, pp. 37–53
- DE ANDRÉS, G., Perfil histórico de la Real Biblioteca de El Escorial, en SANTIAGO PAÉZ, E. (coord.), El Escorial en la Biblioteca Nacional. IV Centenario, 1.ª Edición, Madrid: Ministerio de Cultura, 1985, pp. 561–565
- DE ANDRÉS, G., Real Biblioteca de El Escorial, 1.ª Edición, Madrid: Aldus, 1970, DL: M. 20720-1970.
- DE SIGÜENZA, F. J., La fundación del Monasterio de El Escorial, 1.ª Edición, Madrid: Turner Libros S. A., 1986, pp. 273–305, ISBN 84-7506-178-8
- GARCÍA MORENCOS, P., Importantes incunables españoles en la Biblioteca de El Escorial, en SOLANO, F. (coord.), Fe y sabiduría. La biblioteca. IV Centenario del Monasterio de El Escorial, 1.ª Edición, Madrid: Patrimonio Nacional, 1986, pp. 89–99, ISBN 84-7120-108-9
- GRAUX, C., Los orígenes del fondo griego del Escorial, 1.ª Edición, Madrid: Fundación Universitaria Española, 1982, pp. 309–323/349–351, ISBN 84-7392-210-7
- JIMÉNEZ, N. (Coord.), San Lorenzo de El Escorial: Un paseo por el siglo xvi d. C., 1.ª edición, Madrid: Comunidad de Madrid, 2005.
- JUSTEL CALABOZO, B., La Real Biblioteca de El Escorial y sus manuscritos árabes, 1.ª edición, Madrid: Instituto Hispano-Árabe de Cultura, 1978, pp. 7–129, ISBN 84-7472-007-9
- SANZ BOMBÍN, M. C., «Manuscritos relacionados con el monasterio de San Lorenzo de El Escorial en la Biblioteca Nacional», en SANTIAGO PÁEZ, E. (coord.), El Escorial en la Biblioteca Nacional. IV Centenario, 1.ª Edición, Madrid: Ministerio de Cultura, 1985, pp. 567–572.
- TAYLOR, R., «Las ciencias ocultas en la Biblioteca de El Escorial», en SOLANO, F. (coord.), Fe y sabiduría. La biblioteca. IV Centenario del Monasterio de El Escorial, 1.ª Edición, Madrid: Patrimonio Nacional, 1986, pp. 21–40, ISBN 84-7120-108-9
