= Diego Hurtado de Mendoza =

Diego Hurtado de Mendoza may refer to:

- Diego Hurtado de Mendoza (Admiral of Castile) (1367–1404), Admiral of Castile and tenth head of the House of Mendoza
- Diego Hurtado de Mendoza, 1st Duke of the Infantado (1417–1479), Spanish noble
- Diego Hurtado de Mendoza y Quiñones (1444–1502), cardinal
- Diego Hurtado de Mendoza, 3rd Duke of the Infantado (1461–1531), Spanish noble
- Diego Hurtado de Mendoza, 1st Count of Melito (1469–1536), military commander in Italian Wars & Revolt of the Brotherhoods; Viceroy of Valencia
- Diego Hurtado de Mendoza, 2nd Marquis of Cañete (1478–1542), Spanish nobleman and military leader
- Diego Hurtado de Mendoza (director), Cuban director
- Diego Hurtado de Mendoza (explorer) (fl. 1500–1530s), Spanish navigator and explorer, nephew of Hernán Cortés (see the history of the city of Santo Domingo Tehuantepec in Mexico)
- Diego Hurtado de Mendoza, 4th Count of Saldaña (1515–1566), son of Íñigo López de Mendoza, 4th Duke of the Infantado
- Diego Hurtado de Mendoza, 4th Marquis of Cañete, Spanish nobleman
- Diego Hurtado de Mendoza (poet) (1503–1575), Spanish poet, novelist, historian, and diplomat
- Diego Hurtado de Mendoza y de la Cerda (1489–1578), prince of Mélito; Viceroy of Catalonia, Viceroy & Lieutenant of Aragon
