= Diego Hurtado de Mendoza, 4th Marquis of Cañete =

Spanish nobleman

Diego Hurtado de Mendoza y Manrique, 4th Marquis of Cañete was a Spanish nobleman.

He was the son of Don Andrés Hurtado de Mendoza, 3rd Marquis of Cañete and of Magdalena Manrique, daughter of García Fernández Manrique, 3rd Count of Osorno. Diego Hurtado de Mendoza married twice: first to Margarita Pujadas, with whom he had a daughter; and later to his cousin Isabel de Mendoza. After his death, his title was inherited by his younger brother García.

== Ancestry ==
8. Honorato de Mendoza
4. Diego Hurtado de Mendoza; 2nd Marquis of Cañete
9. Francisca de Silva
2. Andrés Hurtado de Mendoza; 3rd Marquis of Cañete
10. Andrés de Cabrera; 1st Marquis of Moya
5. Isabel de Cabrera
11. Beatriz de Bobadilla
1. Diego Hurtado de Mendoza
12. Pedro Fernández Manrique; 2nd Count de Osorno
6. García Fernández Manrique; 3rd Count of Osorno
13. Teresa de Toledo
3. Magdalena Manrique
14. Alvaro de Luna; 2nd Lord of Fuentidueña
7. María de Luna
15. Isabel de Bobadilla

== Additional information ==
=== Sources ===
- Castro Pereira Mouzinho de Albuquerque e Cunha, Fernando de (1995). Instrumentário Genealógico - Linhagens Milenárias (in Portuguese). pp. 329–30.
- Hobbs, Nicolas (2007). "Grandes de España" (in Spanish).
- Instituto de Salazar y Castro. Elenco de Grandezas y Titulos Nobiliarios Españoles (in Spanish). periodic publication.

Spanish nobility
Preceded by Andrés; Hurtado de Mendoza	Marquis of Cañete; 1561–1570	Succeeded by García; Hurtado de Mendoza
