= Juan Hurtado de Mendoza =

Juan Hurtado de Mendoza may refer to:

- Juan Hurtado de Mendoza, 3rd Lord of Cañete (died 1490), Spanish nobleman and military leader
- Juan Hurtado de Mendoza y Mendoza (1555-1624), 3rd Marques of Mondéjar
