= Count of Osorno =

Peerage of Spain

Countship of Osorno
- Creation date: 31 August 1445
- Created by: John II
- Peerage: Peerage of Spain
- First holder: Gabriel Fernández Manrique, 1st Count of Osorno
- Present holder: Carlos Fitz-James-Stuart y de Solís, 22nd Count of Osorno

Count of Osorno is a Spanish hereditary peerage that was granted on 31 August 1445 by John II of Castile to Gabriel Fernández Manrique, 1st Duke of Galisteo. The title is accompanied by the dignity of Grandee of Spain.

On the death in 1675 of Ana Apolonia Manrique de Lara, 8th Countess, and in the absence of an heir, the title went to the House of Alba, which still holds it.

The name of the title refers to the municipality of Osorno la Mayor in the province of Palencia, Castile and León, Spain.

== Counts of Osorno (1445) ==
- Gabriel Fernández Manrique, 1st Count of Osorno (died 1482)
- Pedro Fernández Manrique y Vivero, 2nd Count of Osorno (died 1515)
- García Fernández Manrique, 3rd Count of Osorno (died 1546)
- Pedro Fernández Manrique y Cabrera, 4th Count of Osorno (died 1569)
- García Fernández Manrique y Córdoba, 5th Count of Osorno (died 1587)
- Pedro Fernández Manrique y Enríquez, 6th Count of Osorno (died 1589)
- García Manrique y Zapata, 7th Count of Osorno (died 1635)
- Ana Apolonia Manrique de Lara, 8th Countess of Osorno (died 1675)
- Antonio Álvarez de Toledo, 9th Count of Osorno (died 1690)
- Don Antonio Álvarez de Toledo, 10th Count of Osorno (died 1707)
- Don Antonio Álvarez de Toledo, 11th Count of Osorno (died 1711)
- Don Francisco Álvarez de Toledo, 12th Count of Osorno (died 1739)
- Doña María Teresa Álvarez de Toledo, 13th Countess of Osorno (died 1755)
- Don Fernando de Silva, 14th Count of Osorno (died 1776)
- Doña María Teresa de Silva, 15th Countess of Osorno (died 1802)
- Don Carlos Miguel Fitz-James Stuart, 16th Count of Osorno (died 1835)
- Don Jacobo Fitz-James Stuart, 17th Count of Osorno (died 1881)
- Don Carlos María Fitz-James Stuart, 18th Count of Osorno (died 1901)
- Don Jacobo Fitz-James Stuart, 19th Count of Osorno (died 1953)
- Doña Cayetana Fitz-James Stuart, 20th Countess of Osorno (died 2014)
- Don Carlos Fitz-James Stuart, 21st Count of Osorno (born 1948) -Ceded countship to his son Don Carlos
- Don Carlos Fitz-James Stuart, 22nd Count of Osorno (born 1991)
