= Hurtado de Mendoza =

Hurtado de Mendoza may refer to:

- Andrés Hurtado de Mendoza, 3rd Marquis of Cañete (circa 1500-1561), Spanish military officer
- Antonio Hurtado de Mendoza (1586–1644), Spanish dramatist
- Diego Hurtado de Mendoza (multiple)
- García Hurtado de Mendoza, 5th Marquis of Cañete (1535–1609), Spanish soldier
- Jaime Enrique Hurtado de Mendoza (21st century), Mexican doctor and lawyer
- Pedro Hurtado de Mendoza (1578–1641), Jesuit scholastic thinker
