= Marquis of Cañete =

The Marquis of Cañete (Spanish: Marqués de Cañete) is a Spanish nobility title and Grandee of Spain. The title was created by the Catholic Monarchs in 1490 and given to Juan Hurtado de Mendoza, 3rd Lord of Cañete.

Famous members of the family include Don Andrés Hurtado de Mendoza, 3rd Marquis of Cañete and Don García Hurtado de Mendoza, 5th Marquis of Cañete, both who served as Viceroys of Peru.

== Lords of Cañete ==
1. Don Diego Hurtado de Mendoza, 1st Lord of Cañete
2. Don Luis Hurtado de Mendoza, 2nd Lord of Cañete

== Marquesses of Cañete ==
1. Don Juan Hurtado de Mendoza, 1st Marquis of Cañete (1490)
2. Don Diego Hurtado de Mendoza, 2nd Marquis of Cañete (1530–1542)
3. Don Andrés Hurtado de Mendoza, 3rd Marquis of Cañete (1542–1561)
4. Don Diego Hurtado de Mendoza, 4th Marquis of Cañete (1561–1591)
5. Don García Hurtado de Mendoza, 5th Marquis of Cañete (1591–1609)
6. Don Juan Andrés Hurtado de Mendoza, 6th Marquis of Cañete (1609–1639)
7. Don Juana Antonia Hurtado de Mendoza, 7th Marchioness of Cañete (1639–1640)
8. Don Teresa Antonia Manrique de Mendoza, 8th Marchioness of Cañete (1640–1657)
9. Don Antonio Manrique de Velasco, 9th Marquis of Cañete (1657–1676)
10. Don Francisco Miguel Manrique de Mendoza, 10th Marquis of Cañete (1676–1678)
11. Doña Nicolasa Manrique de Mendoza y Velasco, 11th Marchioness of Cañete (1678–1710)
12. Doña Ana Manrique de Guevara Mendoza y Velasco, 12th Marchioness of Cañete (1710–1731)
13. Don Joaquín María Portocarrero de Bocanegra y Manrique de Guevara, 13th Marquis of Cañete (1731)
14. Don Agustín Domingo Bracamonte Dávila y Villalón, 14th Marquis of Cañete (1731–1786)
15. Don Fernando Agustín Velaz de Medrano Bracamonte y Dávila, 15th Marquis of Cañete (1786–1791)
16. Don Judas Tadeo Fernández de Miranda Ponce de León y Villacís, 16th Marquis of Cañete (1791–1810)
17. Doña Lucía de Rojas y Fernández de Miranda, 17th Marchioness of Cañete (1810–1832)
18. Don Juan Bautista de Queralt y Bucareli, 18th Marquis of Cañete (1832–1873)
19. Don Hipólito de Queralt y Bernaldo de Quirós, 19th Marquis of Cañete (1873–1877)
20. Don Enrique de Queralt y Fernández Maquieira, 20th Marquis of Cañete (1877–1934)
21. Don Enrique de Queralt y Gil-Delgado, 21st Marquis of Cañete (1934–1992)
22. Don Enrique de Queralt y Chávarri, 22nd Marquis of Cañete (1992–2009)
23. Doña Ana Rosa de Queralt y Aragón, 23rd Marchioness of Cañete (2009–present)
