= Lectionary 41 =

Lectionary ℓ 41
- New Testament manuscript
- Text: Evangelistarion
- Date: 11th-century
- Script: Greek
- Now at: Escorial
- Size: 25.2 cm by 18.2 cm
- Type: Byzantine text-type
- Hand: very elegant

Lectionary 41, designated ℓ 41 in the Gregory-Aland numbering, is a Greek manuscript of the New Testament, written on parchment leaves. Palaeographically it has been assigned to the 11th-century.

== Description ==
The codex contains lessons from the Gospels of John, Matthew, Luke lectionary (Evangelistarium), on 204 parchment leaves (25.2 cm by 18.2 cm). The text is written in two columns per page, 21 lines per page, in Greek uncial letters. It contains musical notes.

It contains an elegantly written menologion (like in codex 43)

== History ==
Formerly the manuscript belonged to Hurtado de Mendoza. It was examined by Moldenhauer, Emmanuel Miller, and Wilhelm Regel, professor in Petersburg.

The manuscript is not cited in the critical editions of the Greek New Testament (UBS3).

Currently the codex is located in the Escorial (X. III. 12) in San Lorenzo de El Escorial.

== See also ==
- List of New Testament lectionaries
- Biblical manuscript
- Textual criticism
