= Francisco Mendoza de Bobadilla =

Catholic cardinal (1508–1566)

His Eminence Francisco Mendoza de Bobadilla
- Bishop of Burgos, Cardinal priest of Sant'Eusebio
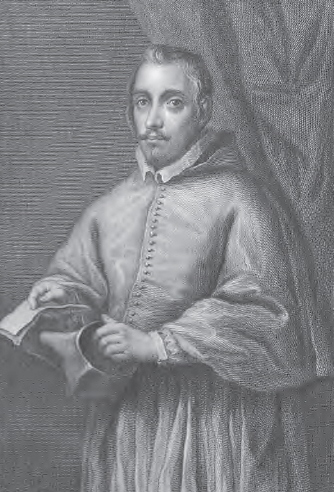
- See: Diocese of Burgos
- Installed: 28 February 1550 – 1 December 1566
- Predecessor: Juan Álvarez de Toledo, O.P.
- Successor: Francisco Pacheco de Villena
- Other post: Previously Bishop of Coria

Orders
- Created cardinal: 19 December 1544

Personal details
- Born: 25 September 1508 Cuenca, Spain
- Died: 1 December 1566 (aged 58) Arcos de la Llana in the Diocese of Burgos, Spain

Francisco Mendoza de Bobadilla (25 September 1508 – 1 December 1566) was a Spanish Roman Catholic Cardinal.

== Biography ==
He was born in Cuenca, the son of Diego Hurtado de Mendoza, 2nd Marquis of Cañete and Viceroy of Navarre during the reign of King Charles V. He studied in the universities of Alcalá de Henares and Salamanca, and subsequently taught at Salamanca, Évora and Coimbra.

In 1533 Francisco Mendoza de Bobadilla was elected bishop of Coria on with dispensation for not having yet reached the canonical age of 27.

He was created cardinal priest on the consistory of 19 December 1544 by Pope Paul III and opted to the title of Santa Maria in Aracoeli. He participated in the Papal conclave of 1549–1550. The new Pope Julius III opted him for the title of S. Eusebio (1550) and promoted him to the Diocese of Burgos, Spain on 27 June 1550.

He resided in the Spanish court for a long time and he had been sent by King Philip II of Spain in different missions. Francisco Mendoza de Bobadilla died in 1566 in Arcos de la Llana, near Burgos.
