= García Fernández Manrique, 3rd Count of Osorno =

Spanish nobleman

García Fernández Manrique y Toledo, 3rd Count of Osorno (c. 1483–1546) was a Spanish nobleman.

He was the son of Don Pedro Fernández Manrique, 2nd Count de Osorno and of Teresa de Toledo, daughter of García Álvarez de Toledo, 1st Duke of Alba. He was president of the Council of the Indies, a position he held until his death in 1546.

== Descendants ==
In 1503, the Count married Juana Enríquez, Lady of la Vega and Ruy Ponce, who died the same year. In 1504 he married for a second time with Juana de Cabrera y Bobadilla, daughter of Andrés de Cabrera, 1st Marquess of Moya and Beatriz de Bobadilla, with whom he had three children. In 1506 he married for a third time with María de Luna y Bobadilla, daughter of Alvaro de Luna, 2nd Lord of Fuentidueña.

By Juana de Cabrera:

- Pedro Fernández Manrique, 4th Count de Osorno (1504–1569)
- Alonso Manrique de Lara
- Juan Manrique

By María de Luna:

- María Magdalena Manrique, married Andrés Hurtado de Mendoza, 3rd Marquis of Cañete

- Diego Hurtado de Mendoza, 4th Marquis of Cañete
- García Hurtado de Mendoza, 5th Marquis of Cañete

- Isabel de Luna

== Ancestry ==
8. Garcí Fernández Manrique; 1st Count of Castañeda
4. Gabriel Fernández Manrique; 1st Count de Osorno
9. Aldonza Téllez; Lady of Aguilar y Castañeda
2. Pedro Fernández Manrique; 2nd Count de Osorno
10. Alonso Pérez de Vivero; Lord of Villajuan
5. Aldonza de Vivero
11. Inés de Guzmán; 1st Duchess of Villalba
1. García Fernández Manrique
12. Hernando Álvarez de Toledo; 1st Count of Alba de Tormes
6. García Álvarez de Toledo; 1st Duke of Alba
13. Mencia Carrillo; Lady of Bercimuelle
3. Teresa de Toledo
14. Fadrique Enríquez; 2nd Admiral of Castile
7. María Enríquez de Quiñones
15. Teresa de Quiñones

== Additional information ==
=== Sources ===
- Castro Pereira Mouzinho de Albuquerque e Cunha, Fernando de (1995). Instrumentário Genealógico - Linhagens Milenárias (in Portuguese). pp. 329–30.
- Hobbs, Nicolas (2007). "Grandes de España" (in Spanish).
- Instituto de Salazar y Castro. Elenco de Grandezas y Titulos Nobiliarios Españoles (in Spanish). periodic publication.

Spanish nobility
| Preceded by Pedro; Fernández Manrique | Count of Osorno; 1515–1546 | Succeeded by Pedro; Fernández Manrique |
