= Juan de Vega, 1st Count of Grajal =

Spanish politician and diplomat

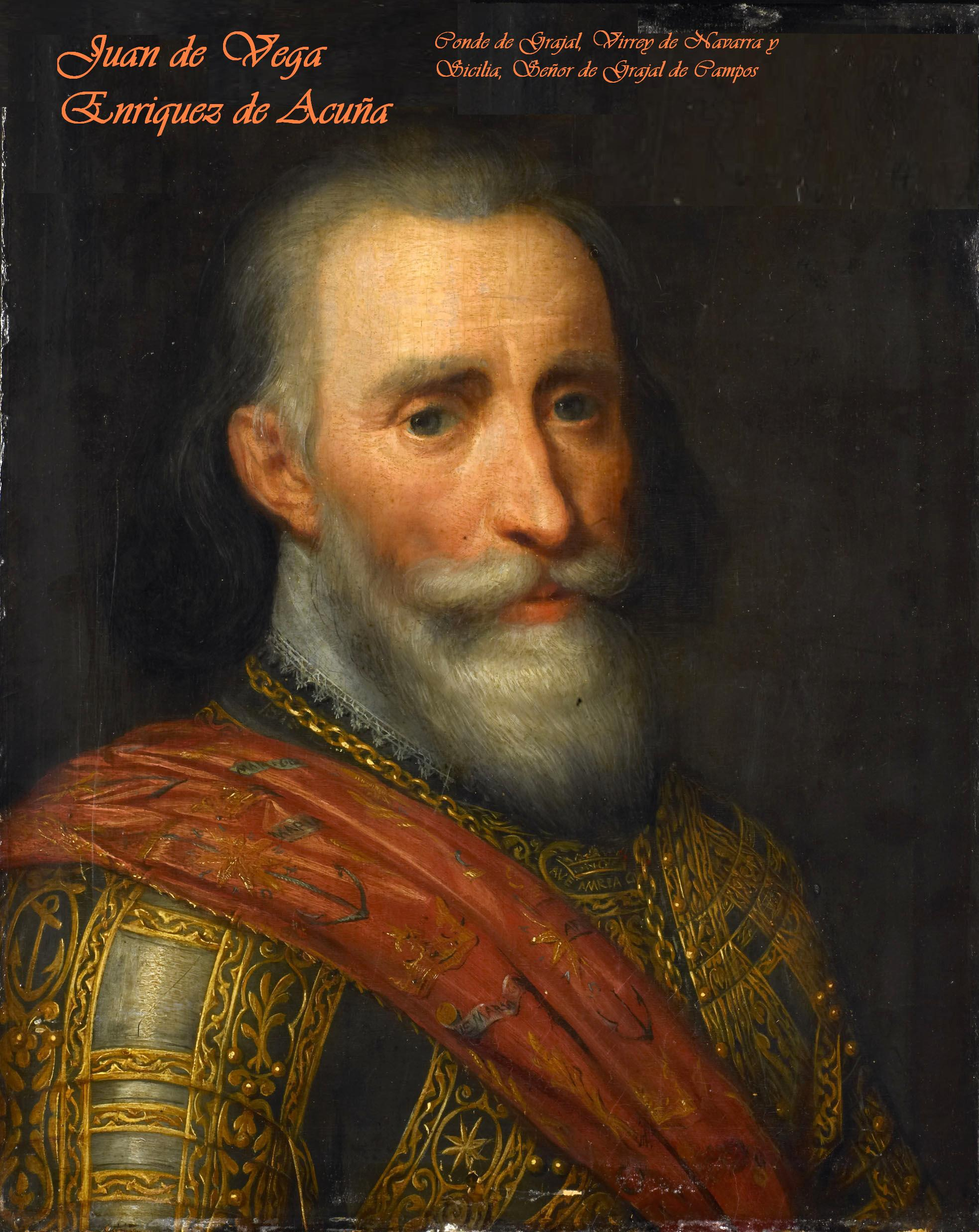
- Born: Grajal County, Spain
- Died: 20 December 1558; Sicily, Italy
- Known for: Capture of Mahdia; Bombardments of Barbary Coast
- Title: Viceroy of Navarre; Viceroy and Captain General of Sicily

Juan de Vega y Enríquez, 1st Count of Grajal, 6th Lord of Grajal, Viceroy of Navarre (1542), Viceroy and Captain General of Sicily (1547–1557), presidente del Consejo de Castilla, was an ambassador of Charles V, Holy Roman Emperor. He first served as ambassador of Charles V at Rome, where he met Ignatius of Loyola. Esteeming him and Ignatius' religious order, the Jesuits, when Vega was appointed Viceroy of Sicily he brought Jesuits with him. A Jesuit college was opened at Messina; success was marked, and its rules and methods were afterwards copied in other colleges.

After the Order of Saint John refused to take control of Mehdia in Tunisia, Charles V ordered de Vega to capture the city to deter the Muslim piracy.

The enterprise known as the Capture of Mahdia (1550) was successful, spearheaded on the sea by a Spanish naval expedition under the command of the Genoese condottiero and admiral Andrea Doria and the Spaniard Bernardino de Mendoza. After two years, the army of De Vega burnt Mehdia, but retaliated against the Order for not accepting the city, and prohibited exportation of wheat to the island of Malta, which was ruled by the Order. To prevent the population from starving, mills were built on Malta.

== Death ==
De Vega died on 20 December 1558 in Sicily. Astronomer Francesco Maurolico tutored two of Vega's sons, and Vega served as Maurolico's principal patron.

Government offices
Preceded by Diego Hurtado de Mendoza y Silva	Viceroy of Navarre; 1542–1543	Succeeded by Luis Hurtado de Mendoza y Pacheco
Preceded by Ferrante Gonzaga	Viceroy of Sicily; 1547–1557	Succeeded by Juan de la Cerda, 4th Duke of Medinaceli
