= Andrés Hurtado de Mendoza, 3rd Marquis of Cañete =

Spanish military officer

Don Andrés Hurtado de Mendoza Marquis of Cañete Caballero de Santiago
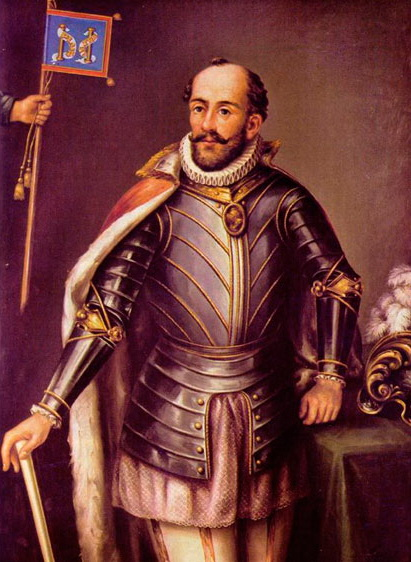

3rd Viceroy of Peru
- In office June 29, 1556 – March 30, 1561
- Monarch: Philip II
- Preceded by: Melchor Bravo de Saravia
- Succeeded by: Diego López de Zúñiga

Personal details
- Born: c. 1500 Cañete, Spain
- Died: March 30, 1561 (aged 60–61) Lima, Peru
- Spouse: Magdalena de Manrique
- Children: Diego; García
- Parents: Diego Hurtado de Mendoza, 2nd Marquis of Cañete (father); Isabel de Cabrera y Bobadilla (mother)

Andrés Hurtado de Mendoza y Cabrera, 3rd Marquis of Cañete (c. 1500 – March 30, 1561), also known as El Viejo, was a Spanish military officer and, from June 29, 1556 to his death on March 30, 1561, the third Viceroy of Peru.

== Biography ==
=== Origins and military career ===
Andrés Hurtado de Mendoza was born at Cañete into a high-ranking Spanish noble family. He was a descendant of Juan Hurtado de Mendoza, Señor de Mendívil. Hurtado was guarda mayor (governor) of Cuenca, Spain, and royal chief huntsman of Castile, succeeding his father in both those positions. He was also a military officer, serving with distinction in actions in Granada, France and Flanders. He accompanied the Emperor, Charles V, to Germany and Flanders.

After being named viceroy of Peru in 1555, he arrived at Panama, at that time part of the Viceroyalty of Peru. Here he delayed his journey to deal with a rebellion of fugitive black slaves. He put Pedro de Ursúa in charge of the suppression of the rebels.

=== Viceroy of Peru ===
He arrived in Lima on June 29, 1556, finding a colony still recovering from the rebellions of Sebastian del Castillo, Godinez, and Girón. The Audiencia had been ruling for nearly four years, with its president, Melchor Bravo de Saravia, serving as interim viceroy. The judges of the Audiencia had disputes among themselves, and they were arrogant towards the new viceroy. Hurtado immediately petitioned the king for the removal of the most offensive. Elsewhere in the colony, the pardoned insurgents were restive, and loyal royalists were agitating for greater rewards. There were still some centers of Inca resistance. In the face of this turbulence, Hurtado adopted despotic measures, executing many of the former rebels and banishing many of the discontented government supporters.

Among his other security measures were the creation of a permanent guard in Lima, and the construction of additional galleys to guard the coast.

He founded the College of San Juan de la Penitencia in Lima for poor Mestizo girls, and another college at Trujillo. He also endowed the recently founded University of Lima. He founded the Hospital of San Andrés, also at Lima, and had the mummies of the Incas Viracocha, Yupanqui, and Huayna Capac moved there. In 1558 he founded the city of Cuenca, near the former Inca royal residence of Tomebampa (Ecuador). In Chile he founded the cities of Mendoza and Osorno (1559), and the Audiencia of Chuquisaca.

Also in 1558, the viceroy sent out several exploring expeditions, intended also as punitive forces against bands of adventurers. He entrusted the pacification of the Amazon to his faithful supporter Pedro de Ursúa, and the conquest of the Chiriguanos and the plains of Condorillo to Andrés Manso.

He named his son García, 22 years old at the time, governor of Chile. In 1557 the Portuguese Enrique Garcés discovered the mineral mercury in Huancavélica, necessary for the extraction of silver.

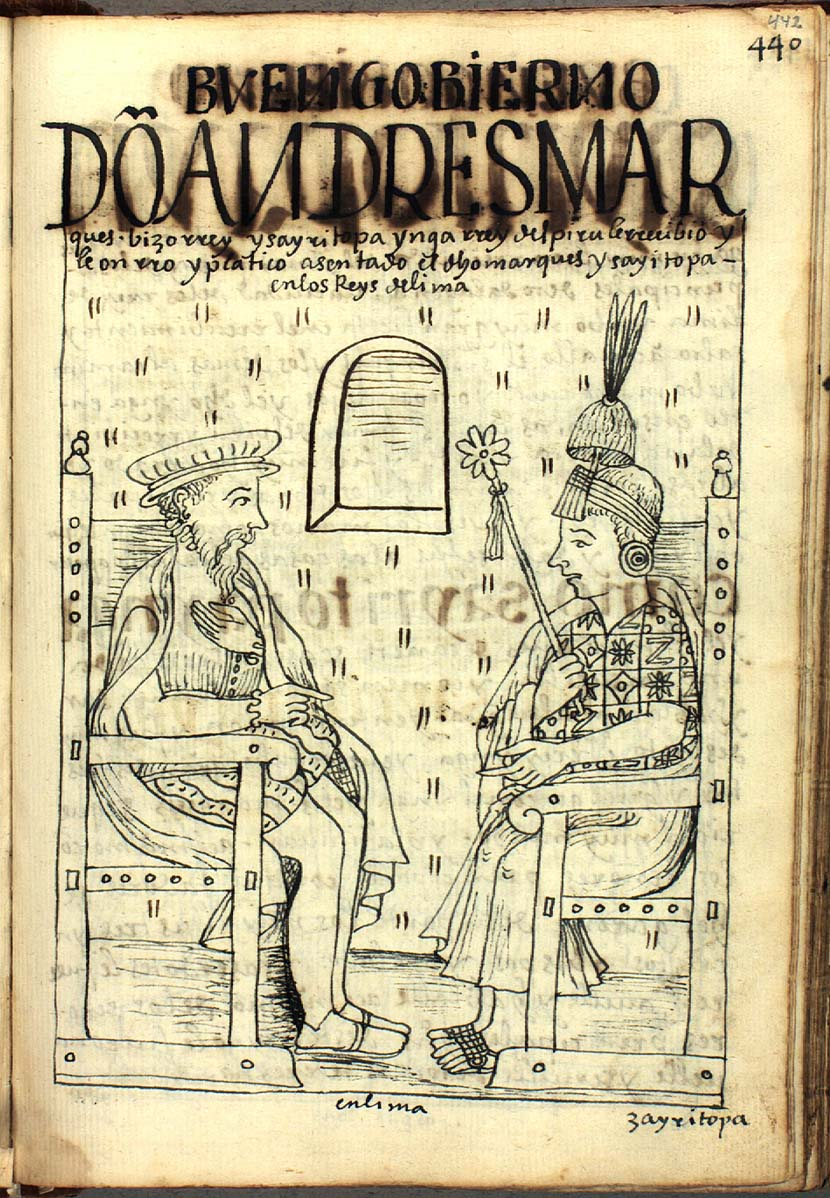
Viceroy Don Andrés Hurtado de Mendoza receives Sayri Tupac Inca, King of Peru, and honors him in Lima.

Still in 1558 he reestablished the local jurisdiction of native chiefs. On January 5, 1560 he met with the last grandson of Huayna Capac, Sayri Tupac Inca in Lima. Sayri Tupac renounced his claim to the Inca Empire and accepted baptism, as Diego. In return he received the title of Prince of Yucay, with a rich revenue.

Hurtado prohibited the sale of alcoholic beverages to the Indigenous.

Meanwhile, complaints about Hurtado's arbitrary and cruel governance, especially from those he had exiled, caused King Philip II to remove him from office. (Other complaints against Hurtado were the lack of control of the economy, and the garroting of Captain Robles in his own bed.) In his place, the king appointed Diego López de Zúñiga, 4th Count of Nieva. López arrived at Paita in January 1561. His communications with Hurtado before reaching Lima were disrespectful. Hurtado fell sick and died in Lima, before López arrived the capital. He was interred in the Cathedral of Cuenca, in Spain.

== Descendants ==
In 1532, the Marquis married Magdalena Manrique y Luna, daughter of García Fernandez Manrique, 3rd Count of Osorno and of his third wife María de Luna y Bobadilla, with whom he had seventeen children.

By Magdalena Manrique:

- Diego Hurtado de Mendoza, 4th Marquis of Cañete
- García Hurtado de Mendoza, 5th Marquis of Cañete (1535–1609)
- Francisco de Mendoza, Archbishop of Burgos
- Pedro de Mendoza
- Rodrigo Hurtado de Mendoza y Pacheco, 1st Lord of Fregenal de la Sierra
- Fernando de Mendoza
- Juan Hurtado de Mendoza
- Alvaro de Mendoza
- Andrés de Mendoza
- Felipe de Mendoza
- María de Mendoza
- Francisca de Mendoza
- Teresa de Mendoza

== Ancestry ==
8. Juan Hurtado de Mendoza; 1st Marquis of Cañete
4. Honorato de Mendoza
9. Inés Manrique
2. Diego Hurtado de Mendoza; 2nd Marquis of Cañete
10. Juan de Silva; 1st Count of Cifuentes
5. Francisca de Silva
11. Inés de Ribera
1. Andrés Hurtado de Mendoza
12. Pedro López de Madrid
6. Andrés de Cabrera; 1st Marquis of Moya
13. María Alonso de Cabrera
3. Isabel de Cabrera
14. Mosén Pedro de Bobadilla
7. Beatriz de Bobadilla
15. María Maldonado Bonal

== Sources ==
- Castro Pereira Mouzinho de Albuquerque e Cunha, Fernando de (1995). Instrumentário Genealógico - Linhagens Milenárias (in Portuguese). pp. 329–30.
- Hobbs, Nicolas (2007). "Grandes de España" (in Spanish). Archived from the original on 25 October 2008.
- Instituto de Salazar y Castro. Elenco de Grandezas y Titulos Nobiliarios Españoles (in Spanish). periodic publication.
- "arteHistoria" (in Spanish). 2007. Archived from the original on 2011-07-20.
- "Mendoza: Poderosos Señores" (in Spanish). 2007. Archived from the original on 3 March 2016.

Government offices
Preceded by Melchor; Bravo de Saravia	Viceroy of Peru; 1556–1561	Succeeded by The Count of Nieva
Spanish nobility
Preceded by Diego; Hurtado de Mendoza	Marquis of Cañete; 1542–1561	Succeeded by Diego; Hurtado de Mendoza
