= Juan Páez de Castro =

Spanish Jesuit priest, confessor to Philip II of Spain (c.1512–1570)

Juan Páez de Castro "Paccius" (c.1512–1570) was a Spanish Jesuit Priest and confessor to King Philip II of Spain.

Educated at Alcalá de Henares, Salamanca and Bologna, he was well-versed in Greek and Latin. After touring the libraries of Italy, he came to appreciate their great value. Thus, Páez de Castro became among the first to recognize the usefulness of a state-funded library and drafted a proposal to Philip II of Spain requesting such. As a result of his proposal a royal library was built at El Escorial, which was completed after his death. He also helped to develop a demographic survey to study the population of Spain, although he died before the survey was actually implemented.
