= 60S ribosomal protein L41 =

Protein found in humans

RPL41

Identifiers
- Aliases: RPL41, L41, ribosomal protein L41
- External IDs: OMIM: 613315; GeneCards: RPL41
Available structures
PDB	Human UniProt search: PDBe RCSB
PDB	List of PDB id codes 5AJ0, 4UG0, 4V6X, 5A2Q

Gene location (Human)
Chr.	Chromosome 12 (human)
Band	12q13.2	Start	56,116,590 bp
Band	12q13.2	End	56,117,967 bp
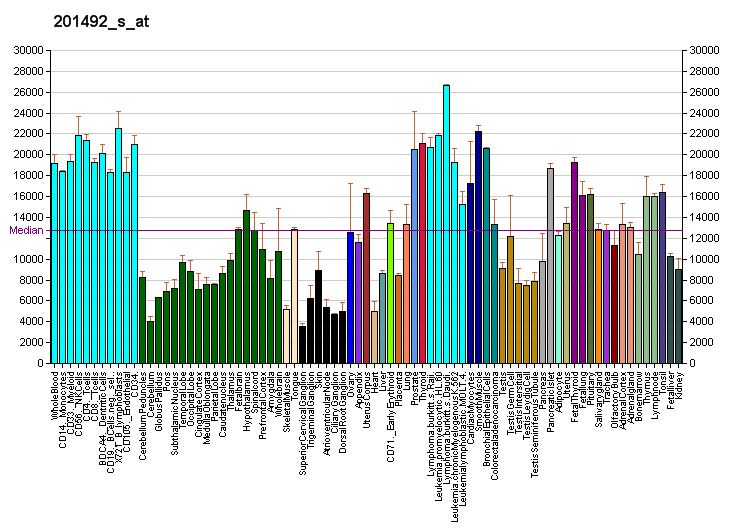
RNA expression pattern
Bgee	Human / Mouse (ortholog); Top expressed in: left ovary; ventricular zone; right ovary; ganglionic eminence; canal of the cervix; fallopian tube; right uterine tube; skin of abdomen; thyroid gland; granulocyte / n/a; More reference expression data
BioGPS	More reference expression data
Gene ontology
Molecular function	RNA binding; structural constituent of ribosome; mRNA 3'-UTR binding; mRNA 5'-UTR binding
Cellular component	ribosome; cytosol; cytosolic large ribosomal subunit; polysomal ribosome
Biological process	nuclear-transcribed mRNA catabolic process, nonsense-mediated decay; SRP-dependent cotranslational protein targeting to membrane; viral transcription; translational initiation; protein biosynthesis; rRNA processing; cytoplasmic translation
Sources:Amigo / QuickGO
Orthologs
Databases	NCBI: entry; OMA: entry
Species	Human	Mouse
Entrez	6171	n/a
Ensembl	ENSG00000229117	n/a
UniProt	P62945	n/a
RefSeq (mRNA)	NM_021104; NM_001035267	n/a
RefSeq (protein)	NP_001030344; NP_066927	n/a
Location (UCSC)	Chr 12: 56.12 – 56.12 Mb	n/a
PubMed search		n/a
- Wikidata
View/Edit Human

60S ribosomal protein L41 is a protein encoded by the RPL41 gene, also known as HG12 and large eukaryotic ribosomal subunit protein eL41. The gene family HGNC is L ribosomal proteins. The protein itself is also described as P62945-RL41_HUMAN on the GeneCards database. This RPL41 gene is located on chromosome 12.

Ribosomes, the organelles that catalyze protein synthesis, consist of a small 40S subunit and a large 60S subunit. Together these subunits are composed of 4 RNA species and approximately 80 structurally distinct proteins. The 60S subunit is a chain of only 25 amino acids and contains an alpha helix and a turn. This is significantly smaller than most ribosomal sequences of around 80 amino acids. The alpha helix is from amino acid three to fourteen, and the turn is from position fifteen to eighteen. Of these 25 amino acids, most of them are arginine or lysine. This gene encodes a ribosomal protein that is a component of the 60S subunit. The protein, which shares sequence similarity with the yeast ribosomal protein YL41, belongs to the L41E family of ribosomal proteins. It is located in the cytoplasm. The gene is made up of three introns in between four exons. Exon 1 is 36 nucleotides long, exon 2 is 25 nucleotides long, exon 3 is 23 nt, and exon 4 is 346 nt. Intron 1 is 115 nucleotides, intron 2 is 389 nt, and intron 3 is 275 nt. Differently from the yeast gene, the introns were only observed in the human gene, although the exons exhibit 99.5% of sequence identity.

== Gene expression ==
The protein is found in six tissues: the immune, nervous, muscle, internal, secretory, and reproductive systems. There are 37 major tissues included in the chart by GeneCards. Overall, the gene expression for the major tissues of these six systems is highest in RNA sequencing with expression seen in 32 out of 37 major tissues . The least amount of gene expression seen is in the Serial Analysis of Gene Expression (SAGE) with expression seen in 20 out of 37 tissues. The medium amount of RPL41 expression was 27 out of 37 tissues in Microarray.

In the immune system, the protein is expressed in the whole blood cells, white blood cells, and lymph nodes of RNA sequencing. The protein is expressed for Serial Analysis of Gene Expression (SAGE) in the bone marrow and lymph nodes. Microarray shows expression for the protein in bone marrow, whole blood cells, lymph nodes, and the thymus. The only major tissue of the immune system with expression measured for all three categories; RNA sequencing, Microarray, SAGE, is in the lymph nodes.

In the nervous system, the protein is expressed in the brain, cortex, cerebellum, spinal cord, and tibial nerve of RNA sequencing. These tissues also express the protein, excluding the tibial nerve and including the retina. Microarray shows expression for the protein in the brain, cerebellum, retina, and spinal cord.

In the muscle system, both the heart and skeletal muscle show expression for the RPL41 gene in RNA sequencing, Microarray, and SAGE. Expression in the arteries for the protein is only shown in RNA sequencing. The smooth muscle only shows expression of the protein in Microarray.

There is expression of the gene in all major tissues of the internal system for RNA sequencing; small intestine, colon, adipocyte, kidney, liver, lung, spleen, stomach, esophagus, and bladder. In the Microarray, gene expression is found in the small intestine, colon, adipocyte, kidney, liver, and lungs. In SAGE, there is gene expression in the colon, kidney, liver, and lung.

There is expression of the gene in all major tissues of the secretory system for RNA sequencing; pancreas, thyroid, salivary gland, adrenal gland, pituitary, breast, and skin. In the Microarray, gene expression is found in the pancreas, thyroid, salivary gland, adrenal gland, and skin. In SAGE, there is gene expression in the pancreas, thyroid, breast, and skin.

There is expression of the gene in all major tissues of the reproductive system for Microarray; ovary, uterus, placenta, prostate, and testes. In RNA sequencing, gene expression is found in the ovary, uterus, prostate, and testes. In SAGE, there is only gene expression in the placenta and testes.

== Comparison between species ==
Similar to the 60S ribosomal protein L41, the PsRbL41 in pea root caps has almost the same chain of amino acids. These are also closely related to 60S ribosomal protein YL41 in yeast and cotton. This PsRbL41 protein acts with PsHRGP1 and PsCaP23 in the process of cell reproduction. Yuen-Ling Chan, Joe Olvera, and Ira G. Wool compared the human 60S ribosomal subunit L41 to the same DNA sequence in rats. The ribosomal proteins L4 and L41 in rats were isolated and replicated to analyze the sequences. Overall, the sequences were 93% identical between rat and human. The beginning of the sequences had a closer match of 97% than compared to the end of the sequence of 75%. This difference also occurred in comparisons with other species, with 92% and 39% of Xenopus laevis L1a and L1b.

== Function ==
The protein can interact with the beta subunit of protein kinase CKII and can stimulate the phosphorylation of DNA topoisomerase II-alpha by CKII. The main functions are to enable mRNA 3’-UTR binding and make up the structure of the ribosome. It is also a part of peptide chain elongation and processes rRNA in the nucleus and cytosol. In yeast, the length of the UTRs are varied from other genes, with 18-22 nucleotides at the 5’ side and 203-210 on the 3’ side. The estimated time for translation of the L41 ribosome was calculated to be approximately 2 seconds in a study by Xiang Yu and Jonathan R. Warner. In the Variant viewer of the UniProt 60S ribosomal protein L41, 15 possible variants are shown from the amino acids in position 3 to 20. These changes are all by missense mutations of base substitution, except for one nonsense mutation with a stop codon added. The chart shows 14 of the variants as predicted to have a consequence and 1 variant uncertain. The most common amino acid change is from G to A and G to T. Other mutations observed were G to C, C to A, and A to C. There are no observed frameshift mutations of deletion or insertion, only amino acid changes. There is also no methylation seen in the interactions of the 60S ribosomal protein subunit L41. There is no drug resistance found for the mutations described. Although the gene is typically expressed, the deletion of the ribosomal protein L41 in yeast does not prevent the growth of the organism. Two alternative splice variants have been identified, both encoding the same protein. As is typical for genes encoding ribosomal proteins, there are multiple processed pseudogenes of this gene dispersed through the genome.
