= Pedro Fernández Manrique, 2nd Count de Osorno =

Spanish nobleman

Pedro Fernández Manrique y Vivero, 2nd Count de Osorno (c. 1453–1515) was a Spanish nobleman.

He was the son of Don Gabriel Fernández Manrique, 1st Count de Osorno and of Aldonza de Vivero.

== Descendants ==
In 1482, the Count married Teresa de Toledo, daughter of García Álvarez de Toledo, 1st Duke of Alba, with whom he had seven children. He married for a second time with María de Cabrera y Bobadilla, daughter of Andrés de Cabrera, 1st Marquess of Moya and Beatriz de Bobadilla, with whom he had one more child.

By Teresa de Toledo:

- García Fernández Manrique, 3rd Count of Osorno (1483–1546)
- Gabriel Manrique
- Pedro Manrique
- Juan Manrique
- Aldonza Manrique
- María Manrique
- Beatriz Manrique

By María de Cabrera:

- Pedro Manrique de Bobadilla

== Ancestry ==
8. García Manrique de Lara; Lord of Estar
4. Garcí Fernández Manrique; 1st Count of Castañeda
9. Isabel Enriquez y Haro
2. Gabriel Fernández Manrique; 1st Count de Osorno
10. Juan Téllez de Castilla; 2nd Lord of Aguilar de Campoo
5. Aldonza Téllez; 4th Lady of Aguilar de Campoo
11. Leonor Lasso; Lady of la Vega
1. Pedro Fernández Manrique
12. Juan de Vivero
6. Alonso Pérez de Vivero; Lord of Villajuan
13. María de Soto
3. Aldonza de Vivero
14. Gil González Dávila; Lord of Cespedosa
7. Inés de Guzmán; 1st Duchess of Villalba
15. Inés de Guzmán

== Additional information ==
=== Sources ===
- Castro Pereira Mouzinho de Albuquerque e Cunha, Fernando de (1995). Instrumentário Genealógico - Linhagens Milenárias (in Portuguese). pp. 329–30.
- Hobbs, Nicolas (2007). "Grandes de España" (in Spanish). Archived from the original on November 29, 2006.
- Instituto de Salazar y Castro. Elenco de Grandezas y Titulos Nobiliarios Españoles (in Spanish). periodic publication.

Spanish nobility
Preceded by Gabriel; Fernández Manrique	Count of Osorno; 1482–1515	Succeeded by García; Fernández Manrique
