= Diego Hurtado de Mendoza, 2nd Marquis of Cañete =

Spanish nobleman and military leader

Diego Hurtado de Mendoza y Silva, 2nd Marquis of Cañete (c. 1478–1542) was a Spanish nobleman and military leader.

== Biography ==
He was the son of Don Honorato de Mendoza (died 1489), Lord of the cities of la Parilla and Belmontejo and of Francisca de Silva, daughter of Juan de Silva, 1st Count of Cifuentes. Diego Hurtado de Mendoza inherited the title from his grandfather, Juan Hurtado de Mendoza, 1st Marquis of Cañete, in 1490.

He was appointed first captain general and Governor of Galicia, and later Viceroy of Navarre in 1534, a position he held until his death in 1542.

=== Marriage and children ===
He married Isabel de Cabrera y Bobadilla, daughter of Andrés de Cabrera, 1st Marquess of Moya and Beatriz de Bobadilla. They had 5 sons and 2 daughters, including :

- Andrés (c. 1500 – March 30, 1561), 3rd Marquis of Cañete and Viceroy of Peru
- Francisco (1508–1566), Bishop of Burgos and Roman Catholic Cardinal.
- Rodrigo, a page at the Imperial Court since 1531.
- Pedro, his lieutenant in the Viceroyalty of Navarre.

== Additional information ==
=== Sources ===
- Castro Pereira Mouzinho de Albuquerque e Cunha, Fernando de (1995). Instrumentário Genealógico - Linhagens Milenárias (in Portuguese). pp. 329–30.
- Instituto de Salazar y Castro. Elenco de Grandezas y Titulos Nobiliarios Españoles (in Spanish). periodic publication.

Government offices
| Preceded by The Count of Alcaudete | Viceroy of Navarre; 1534–1542 | Succeeded by The Lord of Grajal |
Spanish nobility
| Preceded by Juan; Hurtado de Mendoza | Marquis of Cañete; 1490–1542 | Succeeded by Andrés; Hurtado de Mendoza |
