= Juan Hurtado de Mendoza, 3rd Lord of Cañete =

Spanish nobleman and military leader

Juan Hurtado de Mendoza y Guzmán, 3rd Lord and 1st Marquis of Cañete (died 1490) was a Spanish nobleman and military leader.

He was the son of Don Diego Hurtado de Mendoza (Admiral of Castile) and of his second wife Teresa de Guzmán. He was elevated to Marquis of Cañete in 1490 by the Catholic Monarchs, who did not know that he had died some days before.

== Additional information ==
=== Sources ===
- Castro Pereira Mouzinho de Albuquerque e Cunha, Fernando de (1995). Instrumentário Genealógico - Linhagens Milenárias (in Portuguese). pp. 329–30.
- Hobbs, Nicolas (2007). "Grandes de España" (in Spanish).
- Instituto de Salazar y Castro. Elenco de Grandezas y Titulos Nobiliarios Españoles (in Spanish). periodic publication.

Spanish nobility
Preceded by Luis; Hurtado de Mendoza	Marquis of Cañete; 1490	Succeeded by Diego; Hurtado de Mendoza
