= List of works by Jo Mora =

Uruguayan-born American artist (1876–1947)

Jo Mora (1876–1947) was a prolific Uruguayan-born American artist who resided in California and was known as the "Renaissance Man of the West." His works are currently on display at Casa Serrano, the Stanton Center, the Will Rogers Memorial Center, the De Young Museum, the Woolaroc Museum, and in some archives at the Smithsonian Institution and the Monterey Museum of Art. His work has also been featured at the Cartoon Art Museum, the Western Folklife Center, the Los Angeles Central Library, the Adobe Gallery in Santa Fe, and the National Steinbeck Center. The Carmel Mission also maintains the dedicated Mora Museum.

== Architecture ==
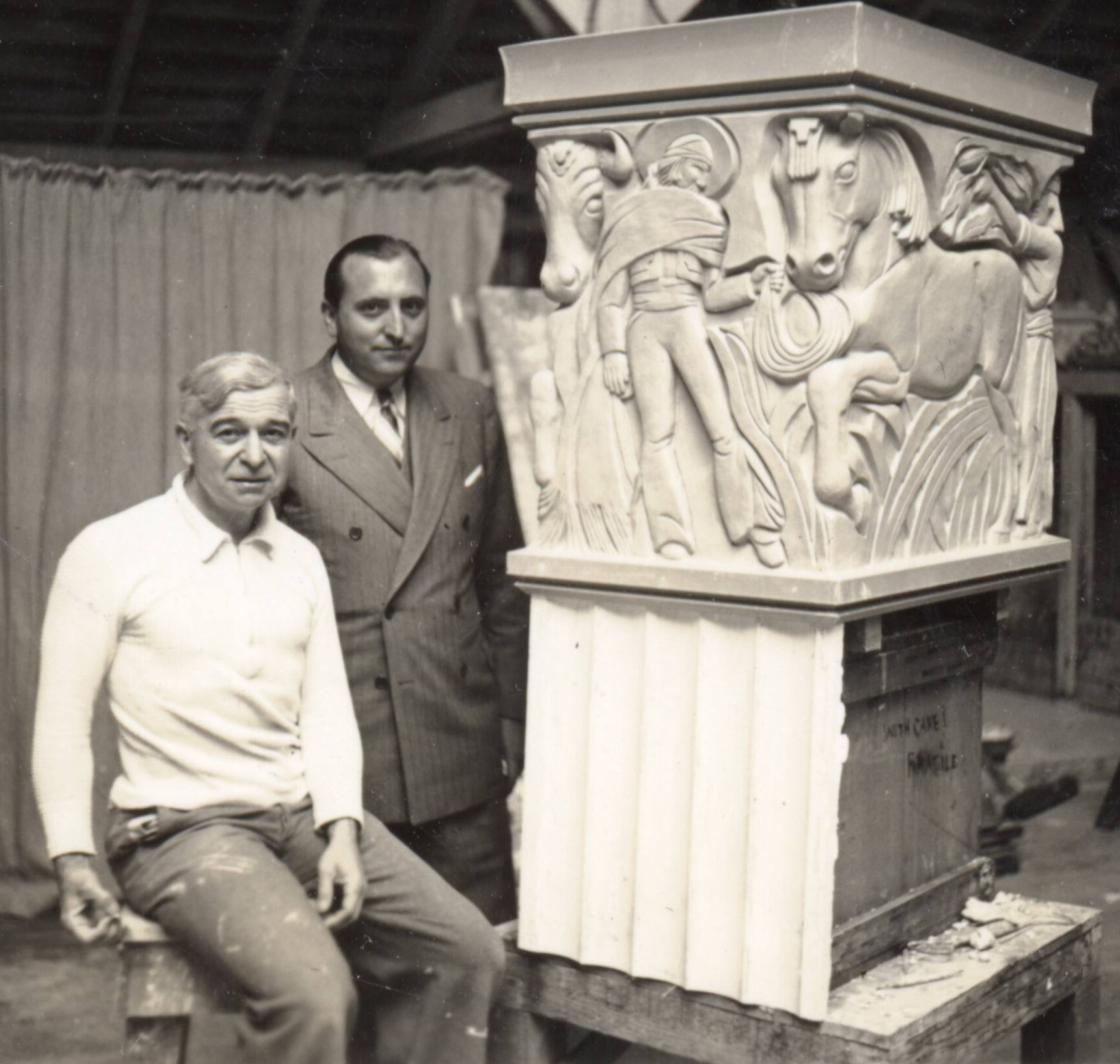
Jo Mora and Robert Stanton

Bas-relief tablets and plaques						
Image	Name	Date	Medium	Location	Notes	Ref.
	The Indian Guide	1918				
	History of entertainment	1932	Cement	King City High School Auditorium		
Buildings and spaces						
Image	Name	Date	Style	Location	Notes	Ref.
	Home of Mrs. Helen Stirling	1924			Inspired by a ship	
	Monterey Convent of the Sisters of St. Joseph of Carondelet	1925	Spanish Revival	Corner of Church Street and Figueroa, San Carlos Mission.	Today, St. Joseph's Pastoral Center at the Diocese of Monterey in California.	
	His own house	1926		Pebble Beach, California		
	Home of Colonel Eastern R. Gibson	1926		Monterey Mesa		
	Senior bench for the football field	1927		Monterey High School		
	Home of Andre Jacobsen	1927		Pacific Grove		
	Home of Jo Jr. (his son)	1929				
	Chapel of the Convent	1930		Villa of the Sisters of Notre Dame de Namur		
Fireplaces						
Image	Name	Date	Style	Location	Notes	Ref.
	Fireplace mantle	1926	Travertine	Hotel Del Monte	Main lobby, unsigned fireplace surround.	
	Grand fireplace	1927		Earl C. Anthony Estate, Los Feliz Hills, Los Angeles	This home was recently sought-after by Katy Perry.	
Fountains						
Image	Name	Date	Style	Location	Notes	Ref.
	Courtyard fountain	1918	Bronze sculpture	James Phelan Estate, Villa Montalvo		
	Fountain grouping	1926	Bronze sculpture	Pebble Beach, California	Featuring three young Ford daughters	
	Standing Bear	1926	Drinking fountain	Union Wool Building, Boston, Massachusetts	Building demolished. Today location of Westin Hotel.	
	Inner courtyard fountain	1936–1937		Monterey County Courthouse, Salinas, California		
Murals						
Image	Name	Date	Medium	Location	Notes	Ref.
	Murals	1895		Clermont Avenue Skating Rink, Brooklyn		
	Murals	1929		Carmel Dairy buiding, Carmel Valley, California		
	The Canterbury Tales	1935–1936		Canterbury Hotel, San Francisco	Joint project with Ferdinand Burgdorff	
Panels and façades						
Image	Name	Date	Medium	Location	Notes	Ref.
	4x allegorical panels	1911		Palace Theatre	Jointly with his father, Domingo Mora	
	Panels and other projects, including Epochs in Pioneer History	1911–1912		Palace Theatre	Completed contract after the death of his father.	
	Panels	1913		Herald Examiner Building		
	Multiple figures and sculptures	1918	Terracotta	For the Reality Syndicate Building	(Today the Million Dollar Theatre)	
	Panels	1924		San Jose Scottish Rites Temple	Today the San Jose Athletic Club	
	Entryway	1926		Union Wool Building, Boston	Building demolished. Today location of Westin Hotel.	
	History of Romance	1933		Del Monte Properties, Carmel-by-the-Sea, California	twelve illustrated panels	
	Panels and facades	1936–1937		Monterey County Courthouse		
Pediments						
Image	Name	Date	Style	Location	Notes	Ref.
	Pediments	1920		Metropolitan Life Insurance Building, San Francisco	Joint project with Haig Patigian.	
	Symbols of Industry	1921		Cadillac Building, San Francisco	Also known as the Lincoln Mercury Building or the Don Lee Mutual Building.	
	Pediments	1921		San Francisco Curb Exchange		
Plaques						
Image	Name	Date	Style	Location	Notes	Ref.
	Bronze plaques	1929		Toro Creek Bridge, Monterey-Salinas Highway		
	Bronze plaque	1929		Grace Deere Velie Metabolic Clinic, Carmel		
	Fisherman holding a large salmon	1929		Home of Jo. Jr.		
	Elevator door plaques	1936–1937		Monterey County Courthouse		

== Bookends ==
Image	Name	Date	Notes	Ref.
	Hopi So-Wuqti	1916		
	Sioux War Chief	1916		
	Hopi Mana	1916		
	Hopi Taka	1916		
	Hopi Woo-Taka	1916		

== Coinage, medallions, and other currencies ==
Jo Mora designing a coin in his workshop

Image	Name	Date	Type	Commissioned by	Notes	Ref.
	Series of 12 "medallions"	1912	Medallion	Native Sons of the Golden West		
	Archbishop Riordan	1916	Memorial coin, in bronze	Knights of Columbus		
	California Diamond Jubilee half dollar	1925	Coin	San Francisco Citizens' Committee		
	Dollar bills	1933	Scrip currency	Carmel Business Association	Alternative local currency for the Depression Economy	

== Dioramas ==
Image	Name	Date	Location	Notes	Ref.
	The Portolá Expedition	1938	California State Building, for the Golden Gate International Exposition	Rumored to have been the largest diorama in the world at the time. Destroyed by fire in 1940.	
	La Novia	1939	Copper Cup Room, Hotel Del Monte	Name of the room was changed to the La Novia Room in 1940.	
	Life of Will Rogers	1941–1942	Will Rogers Memorial Museum	Completed nine dioramas before the outbreak of World War II, left project unfinished.	
	Life of Will Rogers	1946–1947	Will Rogers Memorial Museum	Completed three remaining dioramas after the wartime economy recovered.	
	Depiction of Frémont's arrival	1947	Sutter's Fort State Historic Park		

== Maps and cartes ==
Jo Mora, seen here working on California Carte

Image	Name	Date	Notes	Ref.
	Monterey Bay	1924		
	Forest Activities	1925		
	Monterey Peninsula	1926	Commissioned by Del Monte Properties	
	California	1927	Commissioned by A.M. Robertson.	
	17-Mile Drive	1927		
	San Diego	1928	Commissioned by George Marston	
	Grand Canyon	1931	Mora's first map created without commission.	
	Yellowstone	1931	Dedicated to Horace M. Albright.	
	Yosemite	1931	Dedicated to Stephen Mather.	
	Ye Olde Spanish Main	1933		
	Map of South America	1933		
	Evolution of the Cowboy	1933		
	17-Mile Drive	1935	Revised	
	The Indians of North America	1936–1937		
	Grand Canyon	1939	Colorized	
	Evolution of the Cowboy	1941	Revised	
	Yellowstone	1941	Colorized	
	Yosemite	1941	Colorized	
	Los Angeles	1942		
	Carmel-by-the-Sea	1942		
	Indians of North America	1942	Revised	
	California	1945	Revised	
Published posthumously				
	Evolution of the Cowboy	1989	Revised	
	Yellowstone	1991		
	The Jo Mora Maps Book	2004		

== Memorials ==
Jo Mora with Father Raymond Mestres with the sarcophagus of Junípero Serra

Image	Name	Date	Subject dedicated	Location	Notes	Ref.
	Don Quijote Memorial	1916	Don Quixote and Miguel de Cervantes	Golden Gate Park	Often called the Miguel de Cervantes Memorial.	
	Bret Harte Memorial	1918–1919	Bret Harte	Bohemian Club		
	War memorial	1920	The heroes of World War I	Sather Tower	Travertine marble bench with sculpted bears. Erected by the Class of 1921.	
	Doughboy	1920	The Doughboys of World War I	Marin Civic Center		
	Statue of Junipero Serra	1922	Junípero Serra	Carmel Woods	Wooden memorial atop stone plinth.	
	Father Serra Memorial Cenotaph	1921–1924	Junípero Serra	Carmel Mission	Also designed the chapel.	
	Stylized cross	1921–1924	Jesus	Carmel Mission	On the wall of the Cenotaph.	
	Cenotaph medallion	1921–1924	Pope Pius VI	Carmel Mission	On the side of Serra's sarcophagus in the Cenotaph.	

== Illustrations and cartoons ==
Image	Name	Medium / media	Date	Publisher	Genre	Notes	Ref.
	–	Reportage illustration, visual journalism, comic journalism	Starting 1896	The Boston Herald (Sunday edition)	Newspaper	Multiple contributions	
	–	Reportage illustration, visual journalism, comic journalism	Starting 1896	The Boston Herald	Newspaper	Multiple contributions	
	–	Reportage illustration, visual journalism, comic journalism	Starting 1896	Boston Traveler	Newspaper	Multiple contributions	
	Animaldom	Comic strip	Starting 1907	The Boston Herald (Sunday edition)	Newspaper		
	Sinking of the Steamer Portland	Reportage illustration	1899	The Boston Herald	Newspaper		
	Childhood Memories	Children's book illustration	1900	Grand Union Tea Company	Children's literature	Reprinted in 1910	
	The Animals of Aesop	Children's book illustration	1900	Dana, Estes & Company	Children's literature		
	Reynard the Fox	Children's book illustration	1901	Dana, Estes & Company	Children's literature		
	Madame Angora	Children's book illustration	1901	Dana, Estes & Company	Children's literature		
	The Grasshopper's Hop and Other Verses	Children's book illustration	1901	Dana, Estes & Company	Children's literature		
	Hans Andersen's Fairy Tales	Children's book illustration	1902	Dana, Estes & Company	Children's literature		
	The Hurdy Gurdy	Children's book illustration	1902	Dana, Estes & Company	Children's literature		
	Under Scott in Mexico	Children's book illustration	1902	Dana, Estes & Company	Children's literature		
	Illustrated Animal Football Calendar	Children's book illustration	1903	R. H. Russell	Calendar		
	King Lion and Reynard the Fox	Children's book illustration	1920		Children's literature		
	The Bear-Cat Musketeer	Pen-and-ink drawing	1920's	Citizens' Military Training Camp	Yearbook	Multiple contributions	
	–	Reportage illustration, visual journalism, comic journalism	20th Century	The Monterey Herald	Newspaper	Multiple contributions	
	Fifty Funny Animal Tales	Children's book illustration	1923	Albert Whitman company	Children's literature		
	The Dawn and the Dons: The Romance of Monterey	Book illustration	1924	The Bruce Brouch Press	Book		
	El Paseo: The Passage Way Where New California Meets Old Spain	Book illustration	1928		Book		
	Benito and Loreta Delfin, Children of Alta California	Children's book illustration	1932	Boston, Lothrop, Lee & Shepard Co	Children's literature		
	Cocktail Recipes Mixed by Famous People for a Famous Hotel	Book illustration	1933		Recipe book		
	Dining room menus		1933	Grace Line	Menu		
	Motor Land		1940	California State Automobile Association	Magazine		
	Western Riding Equipment		1941	Sears and Roebuck	Shopping catalog		
	Carmel Diary		1947		Calendar		

== Paintings and drawings ==
Image	Name	Date	Medium	Notes	Ref.
	California Vaqueros	1903			
	Paisano Indians	1903		Depiction of the Paisano people	
	The Grizzly Giant	1904			
	Nevada Falls, Yosemite	1904			
	Mirror Lake	1904			
	Lava Beds, Mojave Desert, California	1904			
	A. B. Gould's Cabin on the South Fork	1904			
	J. J. Mora on the Mojave Desert	1904			
	Series on the Kachina	1904–1905	Watercolor	Gods of the Hopi mythology and the Hopi	
	Texas Cowboy on Bucking Horse	1906			
	Shooting the Chutes	1909	Sketch		
	Jamming the Breeze	1909	Sketch		
	Only a Badger Hole	1909	Sketch		
	Now Shoot 'em Along	1909	Sketch		
	A Bad Sunfisher	1909	Sketch		
	Straight Up & Scratchin	1909	Sketch		
	Tailing a Yearling	1909	Sketch		
	Who's Afraid?	1909	Sketch		
	On the Prof!	1909	Sketch		
	Untitled	1932	Watercolor	Depicting the christening of the Grace Line ship Santa Rosa	
	History and Romance	1934			
	El Mantón de Manila	1935			
	A Mountain Baffled the Conquistador	1938			

== Photography ==
- Original Kodak Camera series on the daily and ceremonial lives of the Hopi and the Navajo (1904–1905)

== Sculptures, figurines, and busts ==
Jo Mora in workshop with model for "La Gitanita," Lewis Josselyn photo, 1926

Image	Name	Subject	Date	Medium	Notes	Ref.
	Hopi Mana		1908			
	Early California Pioneer	Emory C. Singleton	1910	Marble bust	Joint piece with his father, Domingo Mora	
	Figure of Egyptian Woman		1911		Joint piece with his son, Jo Jr.	
	El Coleo		1912			
	The Cinch Binder		1912			
	Forking a Live One		1912			
	Shoot 'em Along		1912			
	The Embroiderer		1912			
	The Hair Dresser		1912			
	The Wolf		1912			
	The Lion		1912			
	The Bronco Twister		1912		Part of the Jo Mora Collection at Stanton Center.	
	Scratching a Twister		1913			
	Indian Life		1913			
	Japanese Figure		1913			
	Nec-Natoma		1914		For the Bohemian Club	
	Navajo Girl		1915			
	Poppy Nymph		1915			
	Mose		1915			
	Snapping Turtle		1915			
	Grecian Lamp		1915	Grecian lamp		
	Saddling a Bronco		1916			
	On the Hurricane Deck		1916			
	A Frog		1916			
	Patty		1916			
	Pals		1916			
	Indian Chief		1916			
	3x figures		1917	Terracotta	For the Pacific Mutual Building	
	Hopi Maiden		1917	Bust	At De Young Museum	
	Hopi Man		1917	Bust	At De Young Museum	
	Bohemian Owl		1918		For the Bohemian Club	
	St. John Nepomuk	John of Nepomuk	1918		For the Bohemian Club	
	Chochonee		1918		Part of the Jo Mora Collection at Stanton Center.	
	Stretching Leather		1918			
	Poppy Girl		1918			
	Straight Up and Scratching		1919–1920			
	Young sailor boy		1919–1920			
	The Doughboy		1920	Bust		
	Hopi Boy		1920			
	Maria Antonia Field	Maria Antonia Field	1920			
	Father Junipero Sera	Junípero Serra	1920			
	2x male sphinxes		1924		For the San Jose Scottish Rites Temple (San Jose Athletic Club)	
	Twister		1926		Part of the Jo Mora Collection at Stanton Center.	
	La Gitanita		1926	Wood carving painted with enamel and gold.		
	Cowboy in Saddle		1927			
	The Greeting		1928		For the El Paseo building	
	The Indian		1928–1929		Depiction of John Bull (Omaha–Ponca language: Mą́žahą́de) for the Marland Estate, Ponca City, Oklahoma. Today at Woolaroc.	
	Prairie Woman or The Squaw		1928–1929	Bronze sculpture	Depiction of Mrs. John Bull for the Marland Estate, Ponca City, Oklahoma. The original name Squaw is considered offensive today. Today at Woolaroc.	
	The Outlaw		1928–1929	Bronze sculpture	Depiction of Belle Starr for the Marland Estate, Ponca City, Oklahoma. Today at Woolaroc.	
	The Cowboy		1928–1929	Bronze sculpture	Depiction of George Miller for the Marland Estate, Ponca City, Oklahoma. Today at Woolaroc.	
	The Cowboy		1930	Bronze sculpture	2nd version with an extra bag next to the cowboy's leg. Part of the Jo Mora Collection at Stanton Center.	
	Standing Bear		1929	Terracotta		
	Tailing the Steer		1930		Part of the Jo Mora Collection at Stanton Center.	
	Scratching High		1930			
	Cheeking the Bronc		1930		Part of the Jo Mora Collection at Stanton Center.	
	Scratch and Plenty		1930		Part of the Jo Mora Collection at Stanton Center.	
	3x figures		1930	Terracotta	For the Pacific Mutual Building, Los Angeles	
	Silver-plated trophy		1931	Trophy	For the Salinas Rodeo	
	Patty		1933		Part of the Jo Mora Collection at Stanton Center.	
	Horse Breaker		1933		Part of the Jo Mora Collection at Stanton Center.	
	Fanning a Twister		1934		Later used as the model for the Jo Mora Trophy at California Rodeo Salinas	
	Horsebreaker		1938			
	Samuel Finley Brown Morse	Samuel Finley Brown Morse	1944			
	Bud Brownell Memorial Golf Trophy		1945	Trophy	Pebble Beach Company	

== In music ==
- Mora's image, "Evolution of the Cowboy", a 1933 poster, reprinted in 1939, promoting the California Rodeo Salinas, next re-purposed, beginning in 1950, as Levi Strauss & Co. advertising, and later, part of the poster, the image of the Sweetheart of the Rodeo, was used on The Byrds' 1968 album Sweetheart of the Rodeo.
- Western performer Mike Beck's album Where the Green Grass Grows includes a song about Mora entitled "In Old California". It was written by Beck and Ian Tyson.

== Written works ==
- Mora, Jo (1920). King Lion and Reynard the Fox. Chicago: Albert Whitman Co.
- Ford, Tirey Lafayette; Mora, Jo (1926). Dawn and the dons; the romance of Monterey. San Francisco: A.M. Robertson. OCLC 948436391.
- Mora, Jo Jr. (1933). A Log of the Spanish Main: A Jo Mora Diary. San Francisco: Jo Mora, Jr. OCLC 652341703.
- Mora, Jo. (1936) Unpublished memoir aboard the freighter Silverwallow.
- Mora, Jo. (1936) Budgee Budgee Cottontail.
- Mora, Jo (1946). Trail Dust and Saddle Leather. C. Scribner's Sons. ISBN 978-0-598-51246-8.
- Mora, Jo (1949). Californios, the Saga of the Hard-riding Vaqueros: America's First Cowboys. Doubleday. OCLC 961562.
- (1979) The Year of the Hopi: Paintings and Photographs by Jo Mora, 1904–1906. Washington, D. C.: Smithsonian Institution.
