= Monterey County Superior Court =

California superior court with jurisdiction over Monterey County

Superior Court of California, County of Monterey
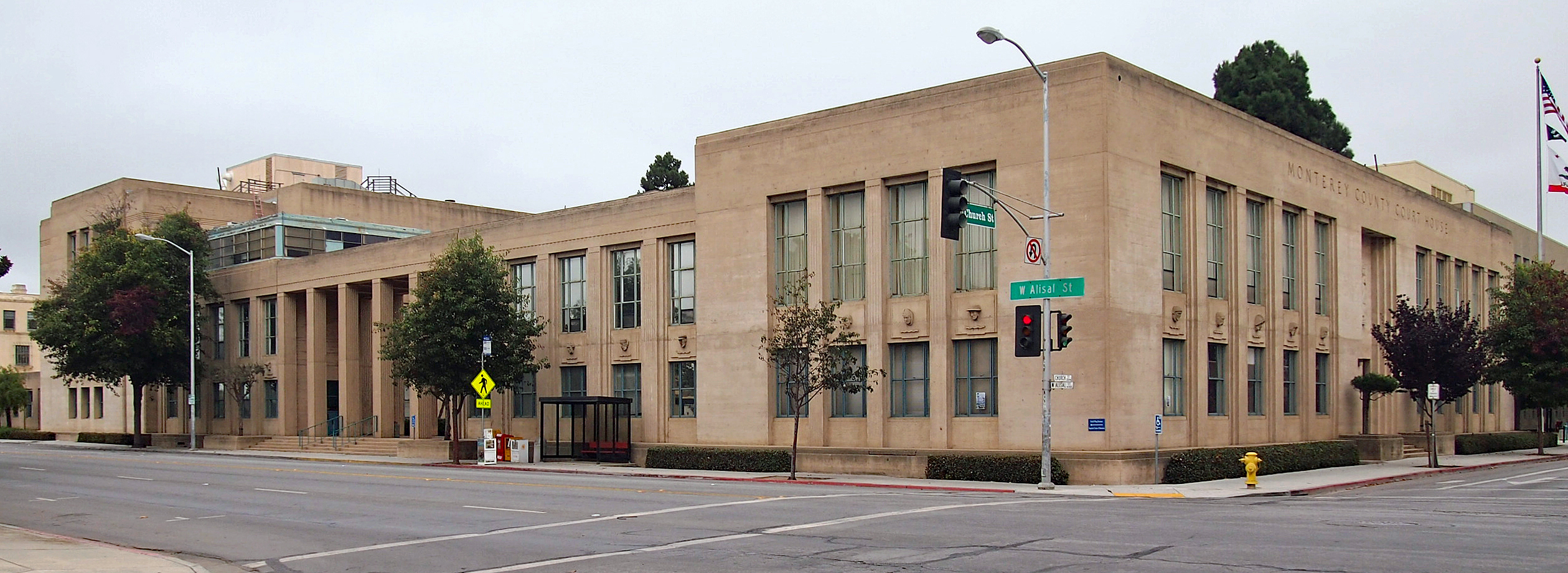
- Monterey County Court House (2013)
- Interactive map of Superior Court of California, County of Monterey
- 36.67349°N 121.65890°W
- Established: 1855
- Jurisdiction: Monterey County, California
- Location: Salinas (county seat); King City; Marina; Monterey
- Coordinates: 36.67349°N 121.65890°W
- Appeals to: California Court of Appeal for the Sixth District
- Website: monterey.courts.ca.gov

Presiding Judge
- Currently: Hon. Carrie M. Panetta

Assistant Presiding Judge
- Currently: Hon. Rafael Vazquez

Court Executive Officer
- Currently: Katy Grant

The Superior Court of California, County of Monterey, informally known as the Monterey County Superior Court, is the California superior court with jurisdiction over Monterey County.

== History ==
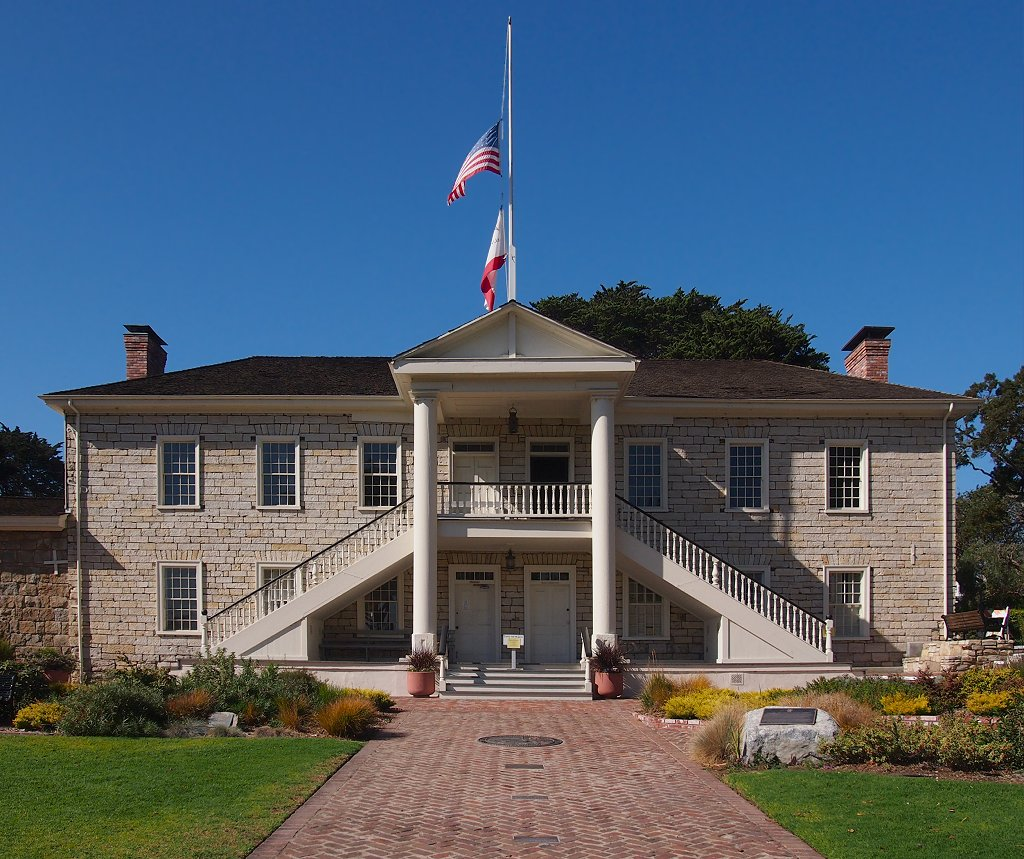
Colton Hall in Monterey (2013)

Monterey County was one of the original counties formed when California assumed statehood in 1850. As the capitol of the former Alta California, the county seat was established initially at Monterey. The Court of Sessions established itself at rooms in James McKinley's house in November 1850, and a levy was issued to raise funds to build a permanent court house, but while the court was in Monterey, it held its sessions at Colton Hall; the first constitutional convention of California had been held there in 1849. Josiah Merritt was elected the first county judge. On November 6, 1872, the county seat was moved to Salinas after the Southern Pacific Railroad extended its line from Gilroy to Los Angeles via Salinas, and the court also was moved.

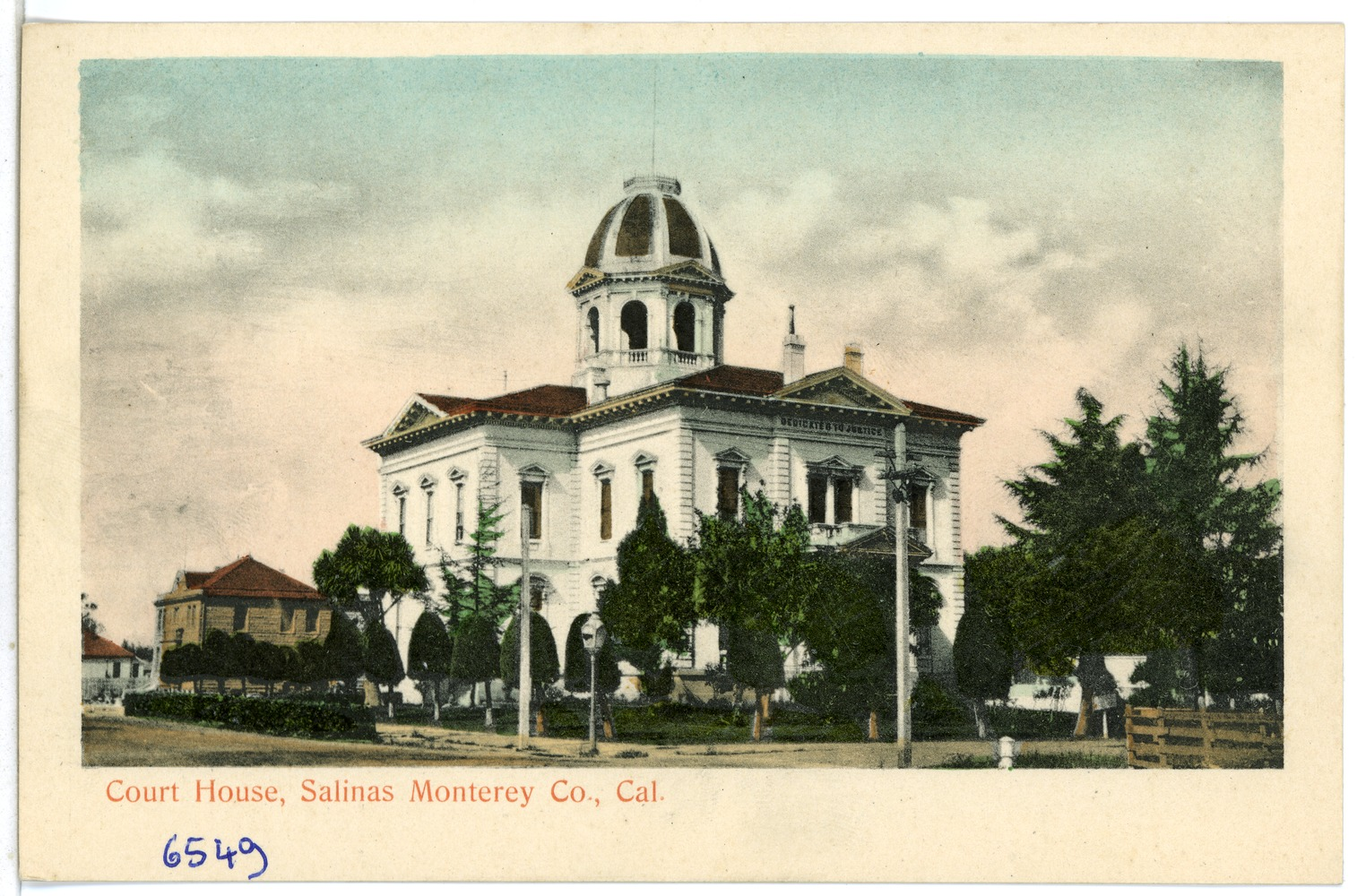
1879 county court house in Salinas (1905)

In Salinas, the county board of supervisors purchased a two-story wooden building on Main Street to serve as the court house on February 8, 1873; they paid Henry Myers US$7,500 (equivalent to $200,000 in 2025). It was characterized as "an old rattle-trap of a building" which was destroyed by fire on January 7, 1877. It was replaced by "a splendid two-story brick court house with centre cupola", accepted on March 13, 1879. The 1879 courthouse was designed by L. Goodrich and constructed by Jacob Lanjen (or Lenzen), with the total cost being approximately US$80,000 (equivalent to $2,760,000 in 2025).

A new courthouse was built around the 1879 courthouse and completed in 1937 as a Works Progress Administration project; once the new courthouse was finished, the 1879 courthouse was demolished and the location now serves as a central courtyard for the 1937 courthouse. The 1937 courthouse is still serving as the main county courthouse; it was designed by Robert Stanton and Charles Butner. The building's decorative elements and fountain in the center of the courtyard were designed by Jo Mora.

== Venues ==
Monterey County Superior Court locations:
1 240 Church St (Salinas, Main)
2 1422 Natividad Rd (Salinas, Juvenile)
3 1200 Aguajito Rd (Monterey)
4 250 Franciscan Way (King City)
5 3180 Del Monte Blvd (Marina)

Main court operations are held in Salinas, the county seat, at the historic 1937 court house. There is a large branch in Monterey and smaller branches in Marina and King City, which handles traffic only.

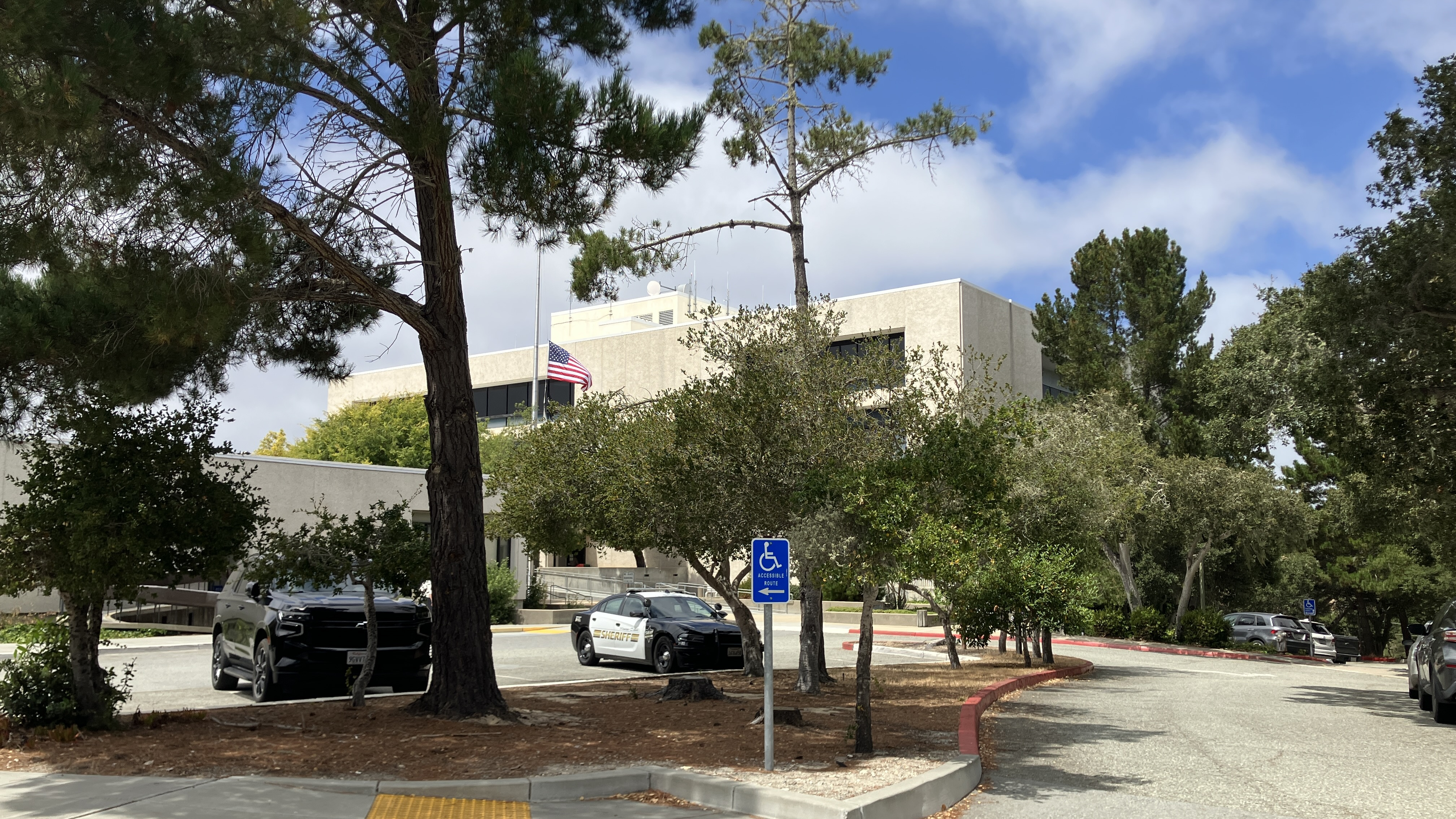
Superior Courthouse on Aguajito Road, Monterey

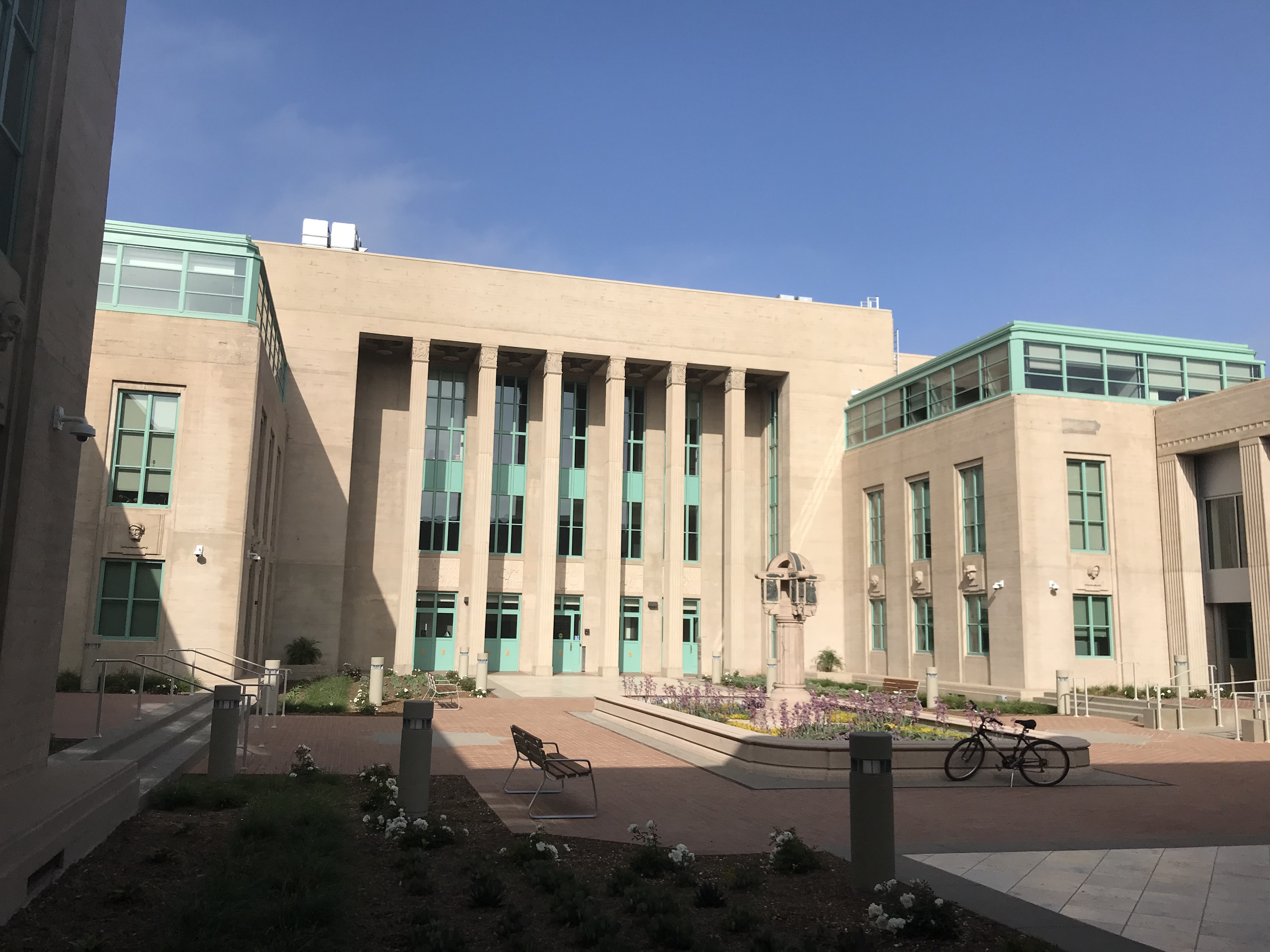
Memorial courtyard and fountain in the 1937 courthouse, marking the site of the 1879 courthouse (2013)
