= Creative journalism =

Journalism with creative elements

Creative journalism refers to a journalistic story that has been enhanced in a creative way by the journalist, possibly with an intent to mislead or with an objective to cause an event to happen that otherwise would not.

== Etymology ==
Creative journalism has sometimes been applied to newly identified genres until a definitive designation is settled upon.

== Meanings ==
=== Linking creative writing and journalism ===
One usage of the term creative journalism is to cover an overlap between creative writing and journalism that occurs in feature writing, narrative literature and other areas. Journalism is the factual portrayal of news and events with minimal analysis and interpretation. By contrast creative is original expressive and imaginative. Creative writing refers to imagination

The UNICEF indicated it wished to celebrate creative journalism by was of the Meena Media award, though the award is mainly divided into creative and journalistic categories.

=== Created story ===
Hugh Cudlipp has defined creative journalism differently, as the art of causing something to occur that would not otherwise materialise and the antithesis of the phantom scoop where the foretold event does not occur. He also puts it as making news not faking news This definition has been alluded to by others.

=== Creative presentation ===
Creative journalism can be applied to a journalistic work that has creative presentation. Used this way, it will often be used to denote a praiseworthy example of photojournalism, visual journalism or graphic journalism.

=== Euphemism ===
As a euphemism, creative journalism refers to the similar use of 'creative' in creative accounting. Here "creative" is used in the sense of "misleading". The term has elements of relationship to tabloid journalism, yellow journalism and fake news, though there are differences in emphasis and objectives. A significant difference from clickbait is the former but form emphasis on the story.

== What creative journalism is not ==
Creative journalism does not occur when the source(s) are incorrect or as a result of spin propaganda providing the journalist has not knowingly colluded or negligently failed to check sources.
