= Richard Koci Hernandez =

Richard Koci Hernandez is a visual journalist, professor, author, and photojournalist. He is currently an Associate Professor and Bloomberg Chair at the UC Berkeley Graduate School of Journalism.

== Career ==
For his work at the San Jose Mercury News, Hernandez shared in 2008 News & Documentary Emmy Award on a documentary called Uprooted about the displacement of residents in a mobile home park. Hernandez is the co-author of the book Principles of Multimedia Journalism, Packaging Digital News.

In 2008, Hernandez joined the faculty of the UC Berkeley Graduate School of Journalism.

Hernandez rose to prominence as an early adopter of the Instagram photo-sharing social media application, using the service to capture and promote a form of journalistic street photography.

A 2012 Op-Ed video Hernandez produced for CNN, titled "Photographers Embrace Instagram" about the indelibility of digital images, was nominated for a News & Documentary Emmy Award in 2013.
