= King City High School =

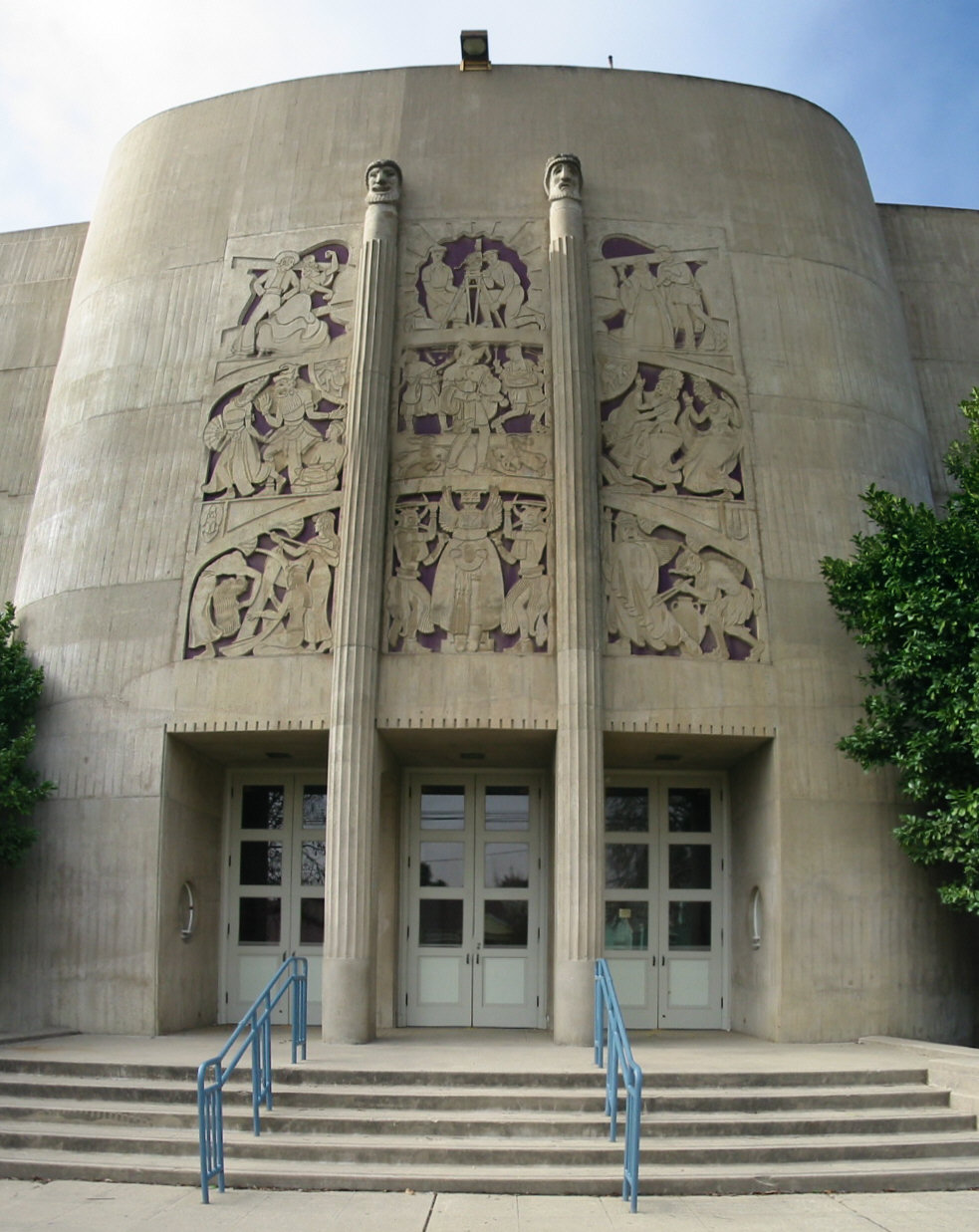
- Robert Stanton Theater at King City High School

Location
- 720 Broadway; King City CA 93930; United States; 36.20907°N 121.13371°W

Information
- Type: Public 4-year
- Established: 1911
- School district: South Monterey County Joint Union High School District
- Principal: Michael Gray
- Teaching staff: 53.65 (FTE)
- Enrollment: 1,200 (2023-2024)
- Student to teacher ratio: 22.37
- Colors: Royal Blue, White, Silver and Grey
- Athletics: Football; Cross-Country; Volleyball; Cheerleading; Basketball; Soccer; Wrestling; Track and Field; Softball; Baseball; Swimming; Golf
- Athletics conference: Pacific Coast Athletic League
- Mascot: Mustang
- Website: http://www.kingcity.k12.ca.us/KCHS/main.htm

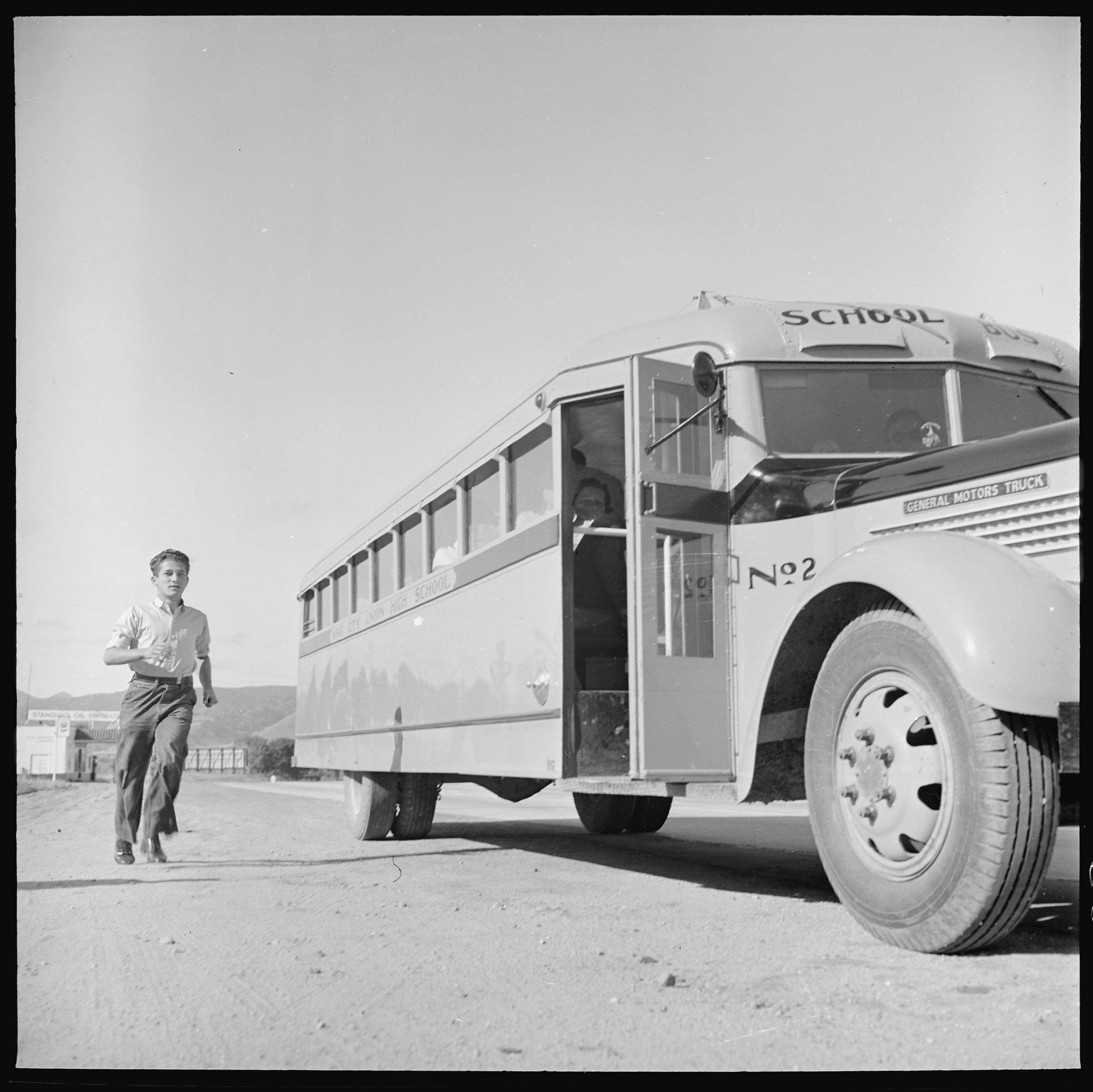
Students boarded a school bus serving King City Union High School at a gas station in 1940.

King City High School is a high school in King City, California, in the United States. It is administered by the South Monterey County Joint Union High School District. The school's auditorium is listed on the National Register of Historic Places.

== History ==
Long before the dawn of the 20th century, education was already becoming an important value to King City. Beginning in 1887, a small public school was established in a storehouse in the City. Notable early teachers include Pearl Brown, Rosalie Branstetter, and Olive Hamilton, mother of John Steinbeck

In 1911, King City High School was founded. However, classes had to be held an separate building until the school was fully constructed in 1913. In 1918, the school had to be closed in order to serve as a hospital for patients of the Spanish flu. After recovering from the crisis, the school grew steadily.

In 1968, the old historic school building had to be torn down and rebuilt do to damage by an earthquake. In 1999, the school district opened Greenfield High School 10 miles north of King City.

=== Robert Stanton Theatre ===
King City High School is home to the Robert Stanton Theatre, which is on National Register of Historic Place. Built in 1939, the auditorium is still used by the high school to this day. The auditorium was designed by Monterey County resident and architect Robert Stanton. Born in 1900, Stanton lived in Carmel and is responsible for some of the most famous buildings within Monterey County. As a result of his key contribution to creating of the auditorium, it was named after him.

== Academics ==
King City High school is a public high school serving around 1,200 students ranging from grades 9 through 12. The school is ranked 4,808th in the nation, 579th in California, and 7th in the Salinas Valley. The overall graduation rate is 93%, which is above the state average of 87%.

=== Course Offerings ===
King City High School offers students a range of AP courses, with an AP participation rate of 34%. Additionally, the school provides students the opportunity to take duel enrollment classes for college and high school credit at Hartnell Community College in Salinas, as well as offering a range of career preparatory classes, such as military sciences and sports medicine.

AP classes offered at King City High School include:

Mathematics	Science	English	Social Science	Foreign Language
AP Precacalculus	AP Computer Science Principles	AP English Language and Composition	AP World History	AP Spanish Language and Culture
AP Calculus AB	AP Enviormental Science	AP English Literature and Composition	AP United States History	
AP Computer Science A		AP Seminar	AP Government and Politics United States	
AP Statistics		AP Research	AP Human Geography	
			AP Macroeconomics	
			AP Microeconomics	
			AP Business with Personal Finance	

== Demographics ==
Located in King City, California, King City High school serves more than 1,200 students in South Monterey County. The school serves a large English language learner population, with around 17% of students classified as ESL students. Moreover, the school's student body is around 91% Hispanic or Latino, 6% white, and 1% Asian.

== King City FFA Chapter ==
King City High School is also a member of the National FFA Organization and its chapter is currently ranked in the top 20 in the state of California and has been part of the school and its curriculum since 1929. The chapter has a long legacy of achievements such as being ranked 3rd overall in the state in 2022. The King City FFA Chapter and agriculture department also offers a wide variety of courses such as:

- Ag Mechanics
- Ag Chemistry
- Ag Biology
- Ag Earth Science
- Ag Econ
- Ag Business
- Horticulture
- Animal Science
- Ag Leadership

== Athletics ==
King City High School Compete within the Pacific Coast Athletic League (PCAL) in the Central Coast Section of the California Interscholastic Federation. The school's mascot is a Mustang.

=== Cross Country ===
The Mustangs have one of the top running programs in Monterey Country. They have won 6 CCS cross country titles

=== Soccer ===
In 2022, the King City High boys soccer team won the Central Coast Section Division 4 title against Summit Preparatory High School. The soccer team also won the CIF NorCal State DV state champion against Wheatland High School.

== Notable alumni ==
- Warren Church (Class of 1947) - Served on the Monterey County Board of Supervisors from 1965 to 1977; Father of the Monterey County parks system
