= Monterey County Courthouse =

- Monterey County Court House
- U.S. National Register of Historic Places
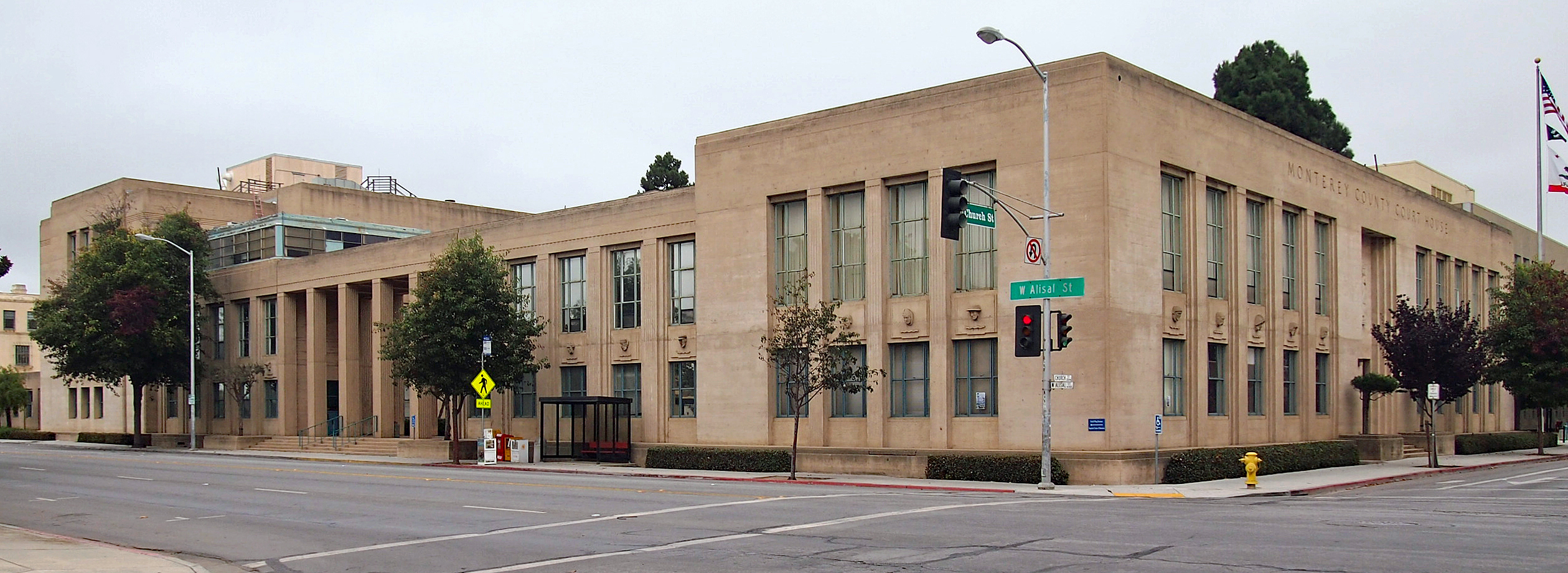
- Monterey County Court House viewed from the southeast

- Location within California Location within the United States
- Interactive map showing the location of Monterey County Courthouse
- Location: 240 Church St., Salinas, California
- Coordinates: 36°40′25″N 121°39′26″W
- Area: 1.3 acres (0.53 ha)
- Built: 1878
- Architect: Robert Stanton
- Sculptor: Joseph Jacinto Mora
- Architectural style: Modern Movement, WPA Modern
- Demolished: 1937
- Restored: 1937
- NRHP reference No.: 08000878
- Added to NRHP: January 8, 2009

The Monterey County Court House is the court house for Monterey County in Salinas, California, United States.

== History ==
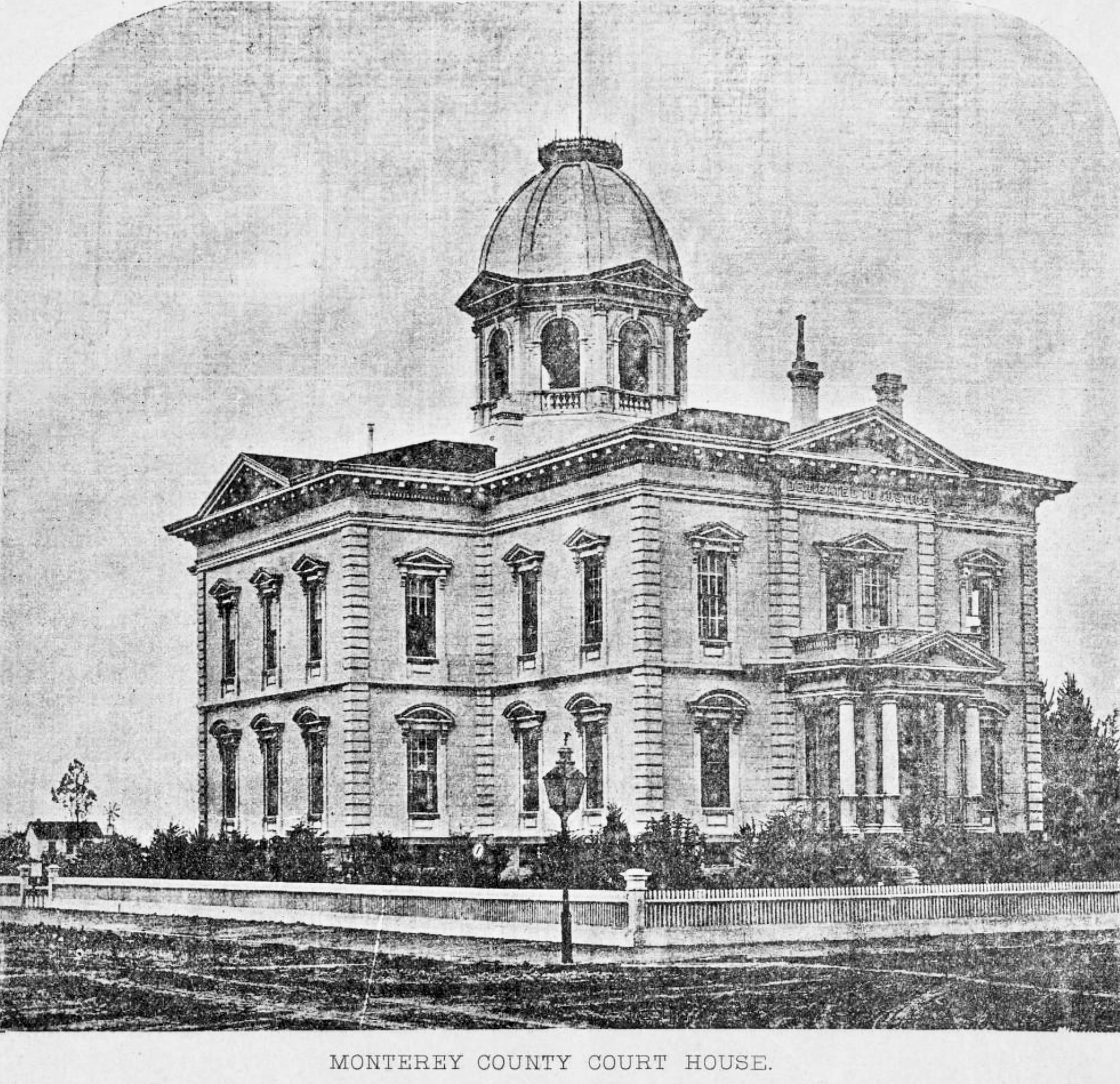
Monterey County Court House (1878)

The first Monterey County Court House was built in 1878, designed by Jacob Lenez, Jr., which was a brick Victorian building. The courthouse remained in use until 1937, when it was demolished. Today a courtyard, lily pond, and commemorative sculpture occupy the site.

The second court house was designed by local architect Robert Stanton in the Art Moderne or WPA Moderne style, and was built in 1937 using funds provided by the Works Progress Administration (WPA). The courthouse features extensive sculpture by Joseph Jacinto Mora. It is currently used by the Monterey County Superior Court.

Stanton designed the courthouse to be built around the previous courthouse leaving a landscaped courtyard space surrounded by an arcade. The two and three story concrete structure cost $450,000, with two stories in concrete and a glass-and-steel third floor the rear of the complex. It is extensively embellished by Mora's sculpture and reliefs, with comparatively sober detailing around the perimeter and more extensive decoration on the courtyard elevations, with customized relief friezes at the tops of the fluted rectangular arcade columns. Small bronze castings decorate the doors and a large freestanding Mora sculpture in travertine forms the centerpiece of the courtyard. Subjects were drawn from the history of California. There are a total of 62 busts of individuals from California history in the window spandrels, and five travertine reliefs of scenes from Monterey County history.

The courthouse was placed on the National Register of Historic Places on January 8, 2009.

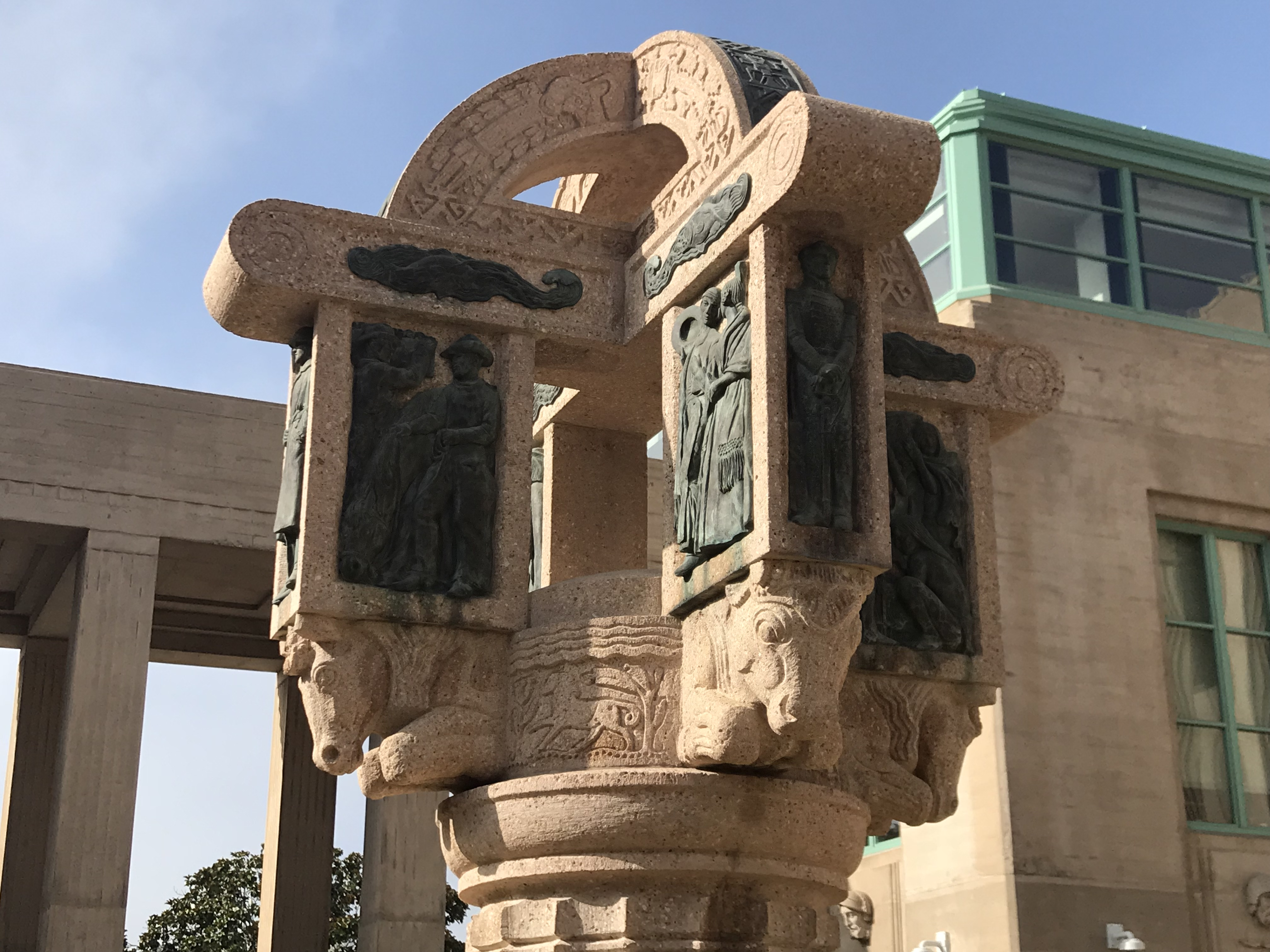
Center courtyard Mora sculpture after renovations

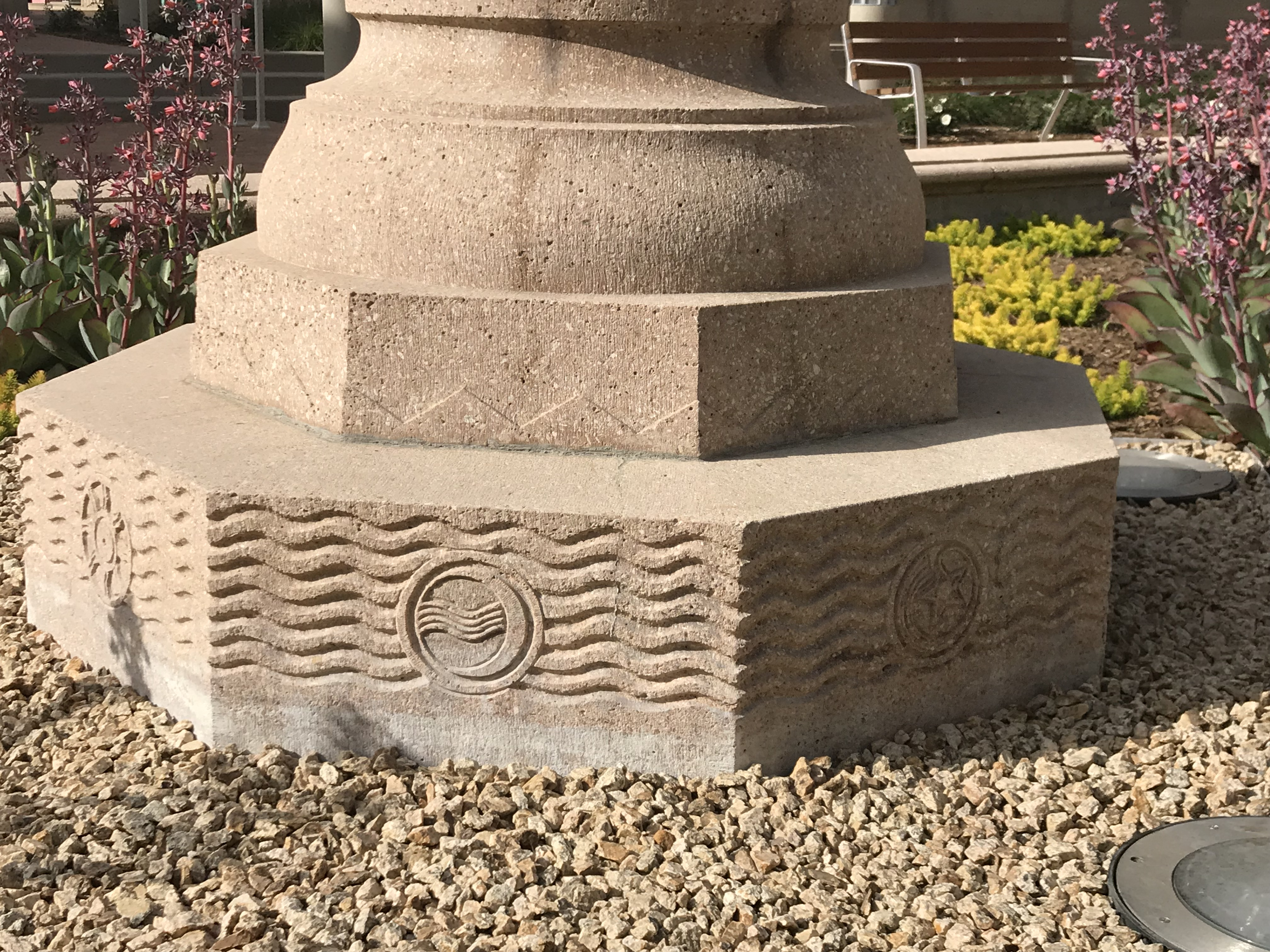
Base of Mora sculpture

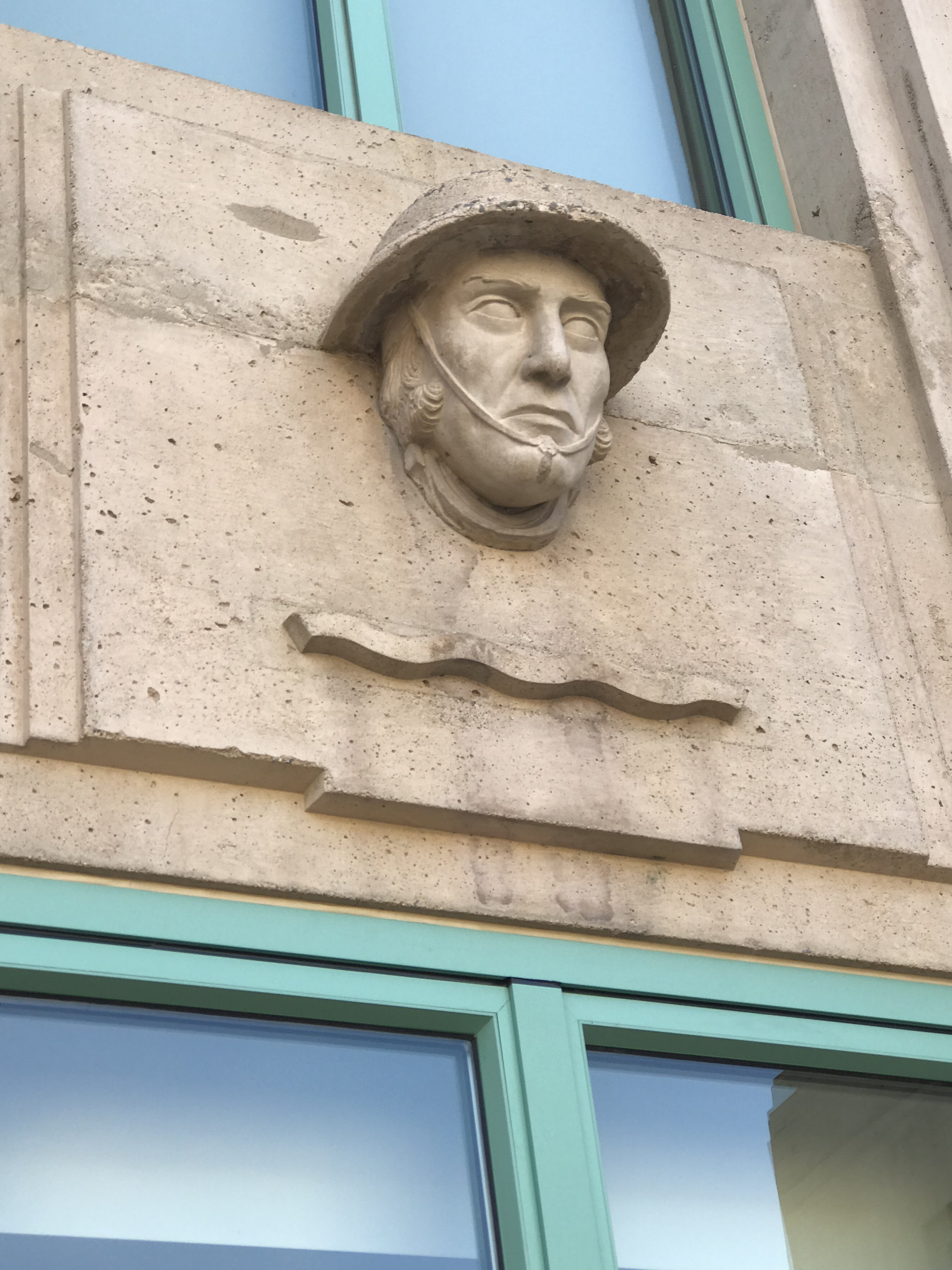
Jo Mora art

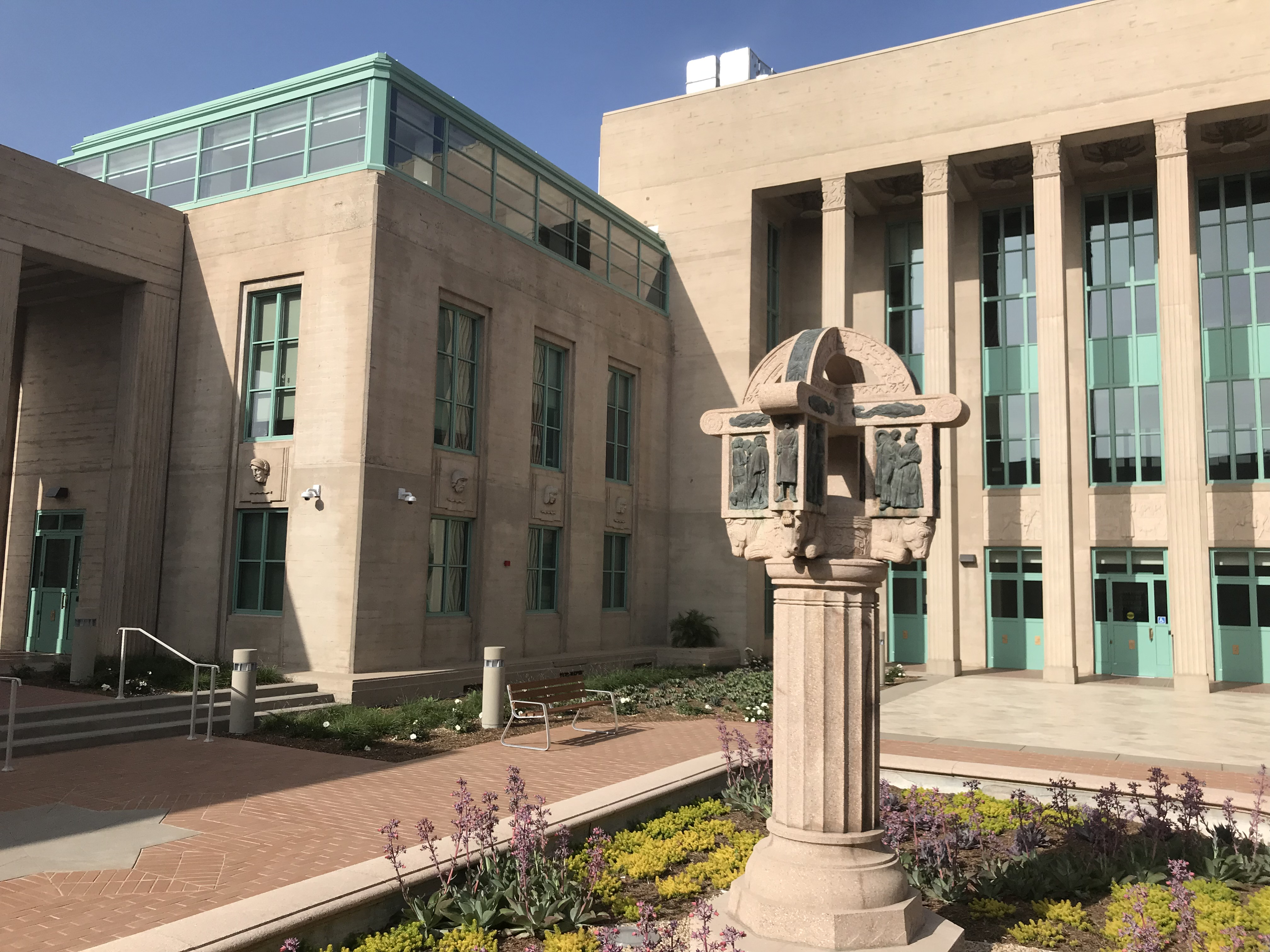
Center courtyard

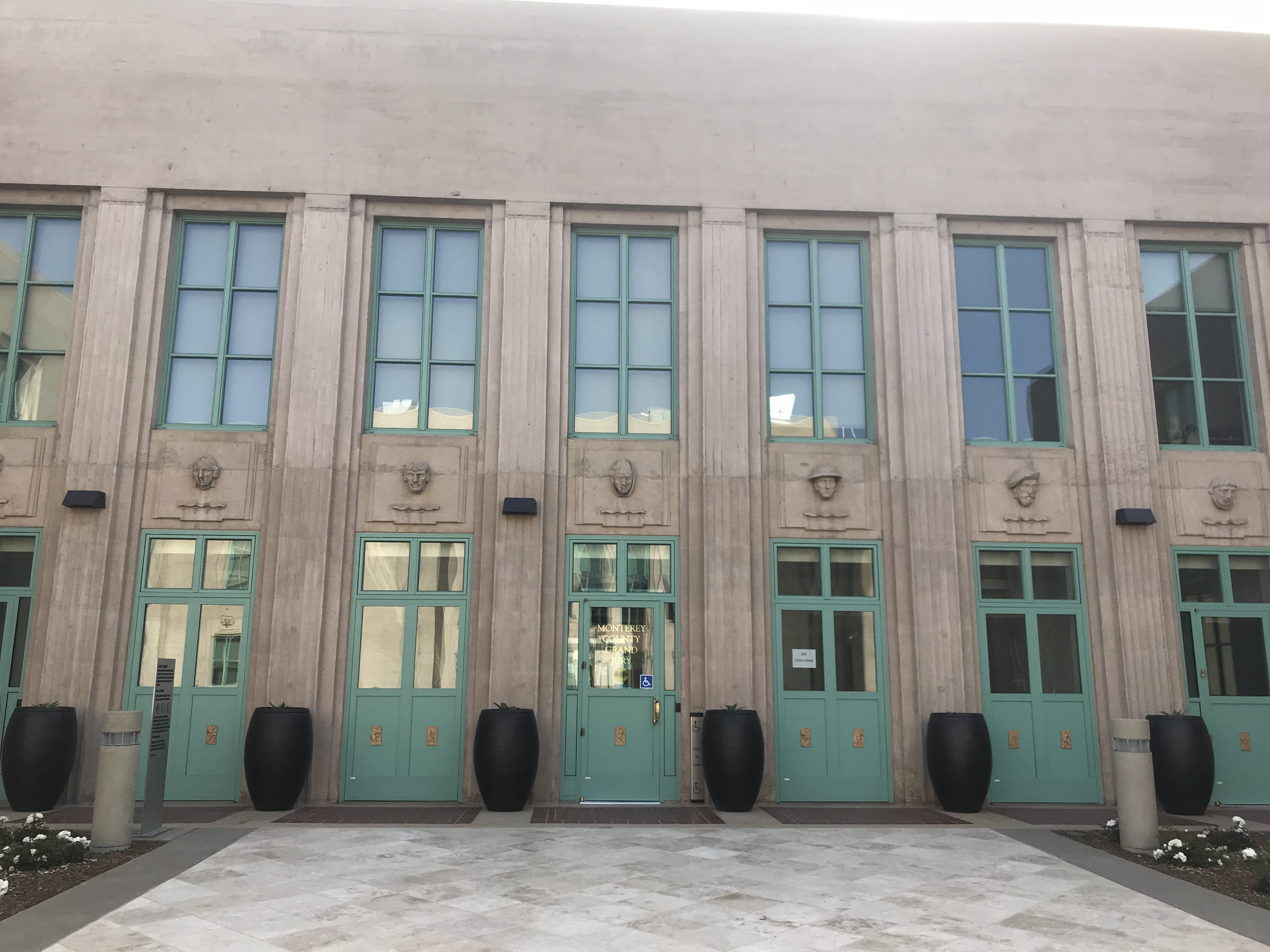
Completed renovations

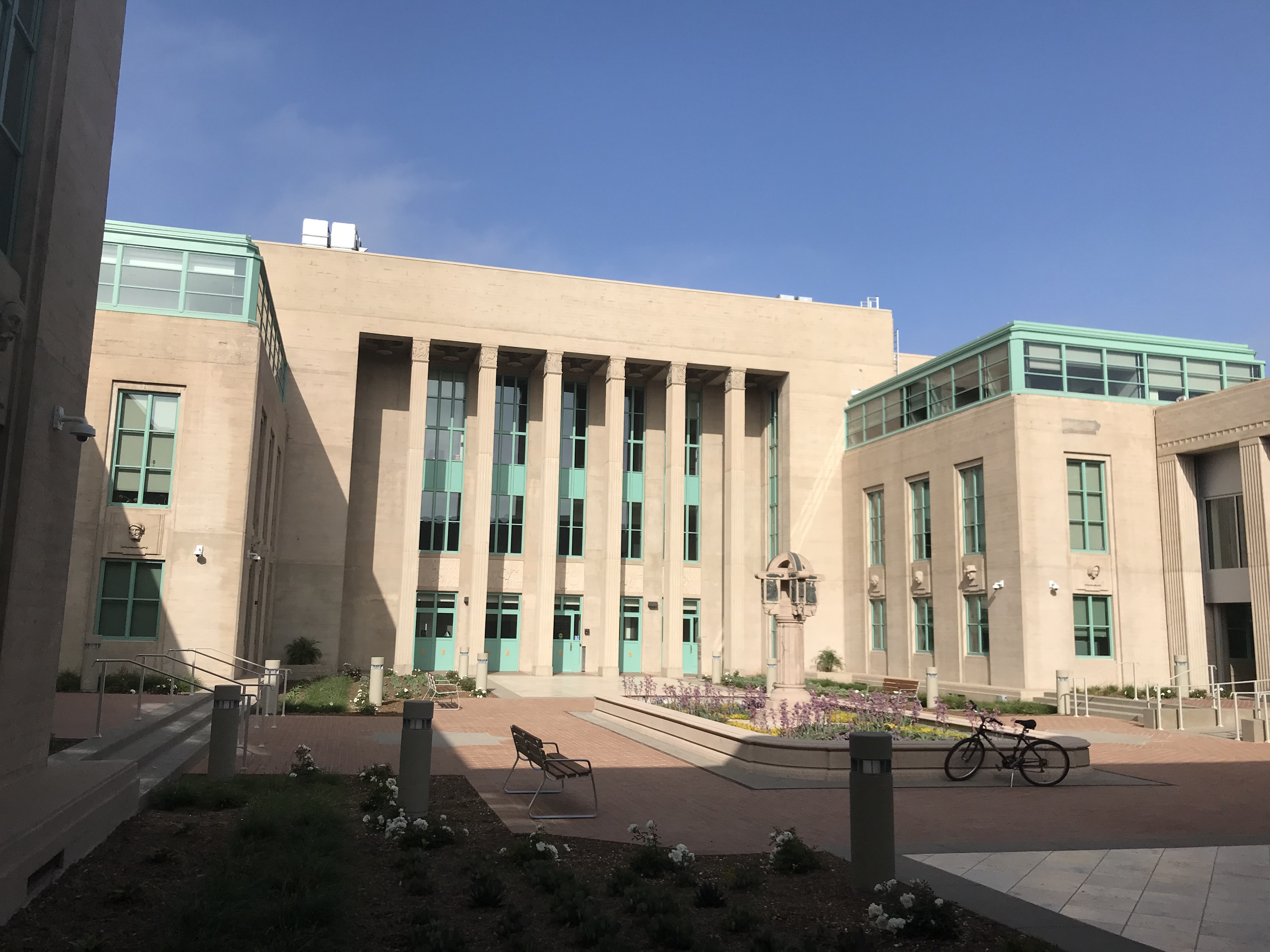
Monterey County District Attorney's Office
