= King City High School Auditorium =

- King City Joint Union High School Auditorium
- U.S. National Register of Historic Places
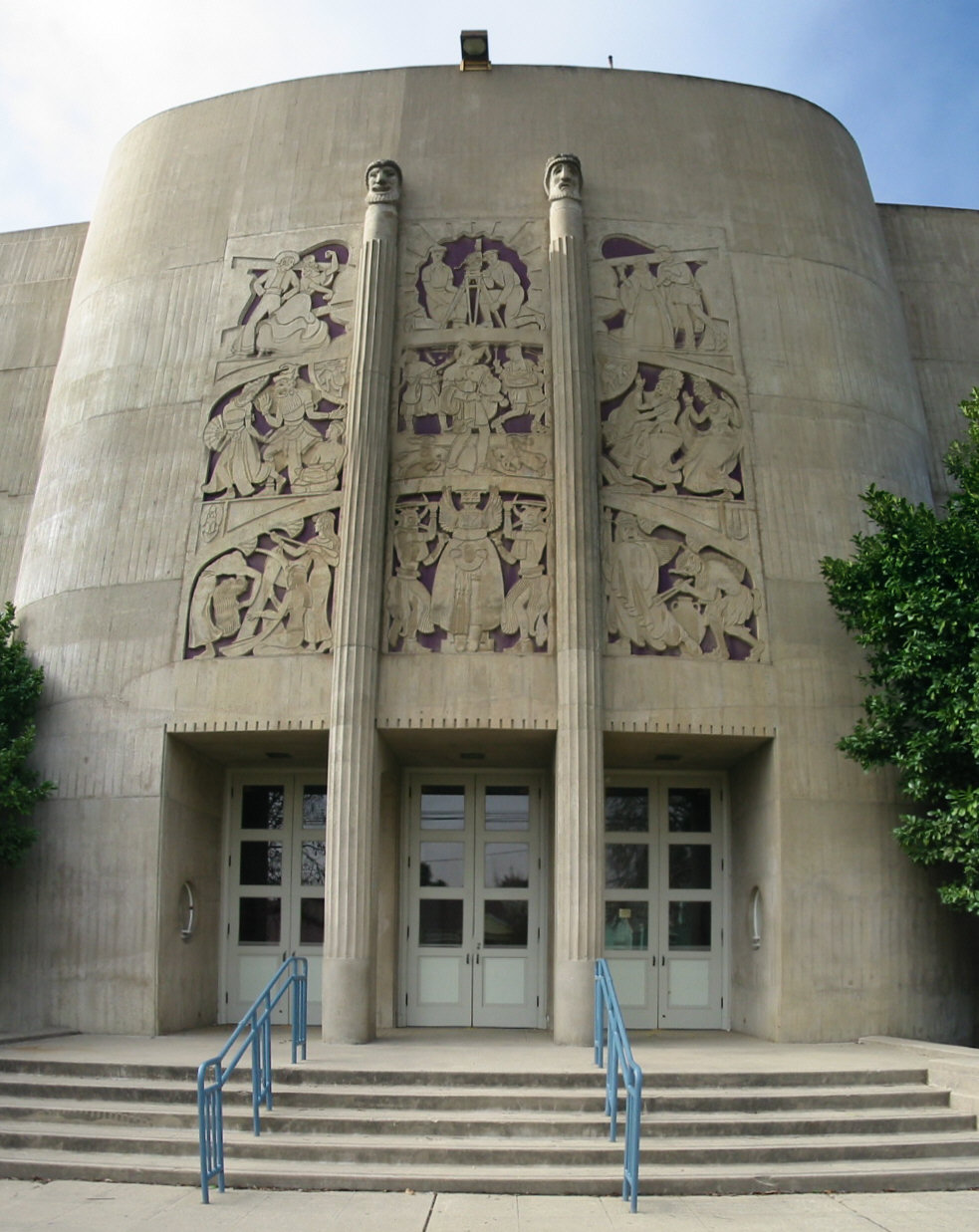

- Location within California Location within the United States
- Location: N. Mildred Ave., NW of jct. with Broadway St., King City, California
- Coordinates: 36°12′37″N 121°7′55″W
- Area: less than one acre
- Built: 1939
- Architect: Robert Stanton; Joseph Jacinto Mora
- Architectural style: Moderne
- NRHP reference No.: 91000917
- Added to NRHP: July 23, 1991

The King City High School Auditorium, also known as the Robert Stanton Theater, is an Art Moderne style auditorium at the King City High School in King City, California. Built in 1939 with Works Progress Administration funding, the auditorium is one of several buildings in the area in a similar style, known as WPA Moderne. It was designed by architect Robert Stanton of Carmel, in partnership with Joseph Jacinto Mora, who designed and executed the building's extensive sculptural elements.

== Description ==
The King City High School Auditorium is executed in cast-in-place concrete. The design makes full use of concrete's potential for plastic form, with compound curves, rounded corners and cast-in sculptural forms. The structure is somewhat elliptical in plan, with rounded corners. A projecting rounded bay at the front comprises the main entrance, with three pairs of doors separated by tall fluted pilasters surmounted by cast busts of Comedy and Tragedy, dividing a triptych relief sculpture that is itself divided into three levels. The ends of the facade curve around to the side elevations, which have inset fluted panels whose pilasters are crowned with more cast sculpture derived from characters from A Midsummer Night's Dream. The rear elevation is comparatively plain and utilitarian.

The lobby is detailed with bright blue wainscoting and ceilings. Curved stairs give access to the balcony on either side of the lobby, with six doors into the main house. Floors throughout are covered in cork, as well as in the aisles of the auditorium. The auditorium seats 596 in the orchestra section and 387 in the balcony. The proscenium surrounding the stage features Mora reliefs and concave fluted pilasters.

The King City Joint Union High School Auditorium was listed on the National Register of Historic Places on July 23, 1991.
