= Jo Mora =

Artist, sculptor, illustrator (1876–1947)

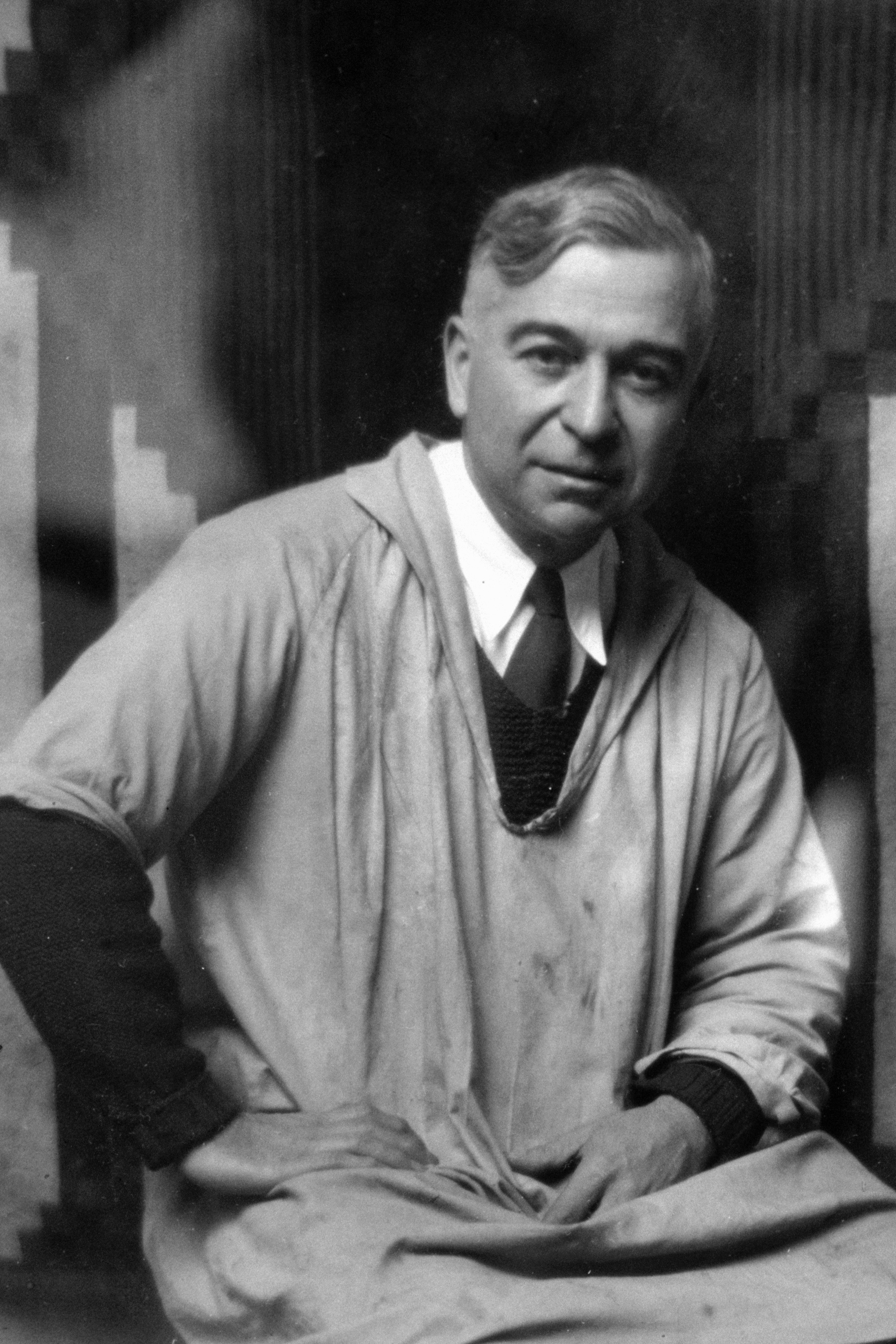
- Jo Mora, c. 1942
- Born: Joseph Jacinto Mora; October 22, 1876; Montevideo, Uruguay
- Died: October 10, 1947 (aged 70); Monterey, California
- Known for: Painting, drawing, sculpture, muralist
- Style: Realism
- Spouse: Grace Needham
- Children: 2
- Father: Domingo Mora
- Relatives: F. Luis Mora
- Website: Official Website

Joseph Jacinto Mora (October 22, 1876 – October 10, 1947) was a Uruguayan-born American cowboy, photographer, artist, cartoonist, illustrator, painter, muralist, sculptor, and historian who wrote about his experiences in California and the American West. He has been called the "Renaissance Man of the West". April 15 is officially celebrated as "Jo Mora Day" in the city of Monterey, California.

== Early life ==
Tintype of Jo Mora at the age of 6.

Mora was born on October 22, 1876, in Montevideo, Uruguay. His father was the Catalan sculptor, Domingo Mora, and his mother was Laura Gaillard Mora, a cultured French woman originally from the Bordeaux region of France. His elder brother was F. Luis Mora, who would become an artist and the first Hispanic member of the National Academy of Design. The family left Uruguay during an insurgency in 1877, when they went to Catalonia. In 1880, they arrived in New York City, and quickly relocated to Perth Amboy, New Jersey.

Jo Mora studied art at the Art Students League of New York and the Cowles Art School in Boston. He also studied with William Merritt Chase. He worked as a cartoonist for the Boston Evening Traveller, and later, the Boston Herald.

In 1900 Mora published The Animals of Aesop - Aesop's Fables Adapted and Pictured by Joseph J. Mora, illustrated with black/white and some color drawings.

In the spring of 1903, Mora arrived in Solvang, California. He stayed at the Donohue Ranch. He made plans to travel to the Southwest to paint and photograph the Hopi. He spent time at the Mission Santa Inés; those photographs are now maintained by the Smithsonian Institution. Mora visited many Spanish missions in California that summer by horseback. He followed the "Mission Trail", also called the "Kings Highway".

In 1904, Mora visited Yosemite. Later, in 1904, to 1906, visited Arizona where he took photographs, painted and otherwise recorded the daily life of these Native Americans. Because the Hopi and other tribes have voiced their concerns more recently about photographs depicting religious ceremonies, the tribal nation should be contacted before they are used. Mora was adopted by both the Hopi and the Navajo. He learned the Native languages and made detailed drawings of what he observed. He was given permission by the elders to visually depict the Kachina, gods of the Hopi mythology, in a series of watercolors. He also led Hopi hunting parties and acted as a guide.

== Career ==
Jo Mora at his family's drawing table in 1910. This gouache painting was painted by his brother, Francis Luis Mora.

In 1907, Mora returned to California and married Grace Needham. Their son, Joseph Needham Mora, was born on March 8, 1908. The Moras moved to San Jose, California, where Mora continued his work.

On 22 February 1911, the Native Sons of the Golden West Building, in San Francisco, with six terra cotta panels, by Domingo Mora and his son, Jo Mora, was dedicated.

In 1915, he served on the International Jury of Awards at the Panama–Pacific International Exposition and displayed six sculptures.

In 1915-16 two of his sculptural commissions were revealed: the bronze memorial tablet with the profile of the late Archbishop Patrick W. Riordan for the Knights of Columbus and the Cervantes Monument in San Francisco's Golden Gate Park. By 1919, he was sculpting for the Bohemian Club, including the Bret Harte Memorial plaque, completed in August 1919 and mounted on the outside of the private men's club building in San Francisco.

=== Carmel-by-the-Sea ===
Jo Mora with Father Raymond Mestres with the sarcophagus of Junípero Serra.

In 1921, the Mora family relocated to Carmel-by-the-Sea, California, the largest art colony on the West Coast, making it their primary residence. He constructed a Craftsman-style home, which is located on the west side of San Carlos Street, the third house south of 1st Avenue.

Mora received a commission for the bronze and travertine Cenotaph, for Father Junípero Serra in the Memorial Chapel at the west end of Mission Carmel.

Mora was a director of the Carmel Art Association as early as 1934. His sculptures were exhibited between 1927 and 1934 in various galleries in Carmel.

Jo Mora is a serious sculptor, a responsible amateur actor; when mixed up with pen and ink, a humorist! Comic strips was once his trade. He was famous at it. That was years ago but his art of cartooning bloomed again when in recent years he produced the well known Mora Map of the Monterey Peninsula. Most successful with bronze statue creations which decorate many gardens in East and West. If he has a specialty in figures it is cowboys. He knows his West. Jo Mora will ever be famed for his portrayal of Pancho Lopez, The Bad Man, at Carmel Playhouse. He does everything well and is handsome while doing it. He is happily married-alas!

— Carmel Pine Cone

Jo Mora designing a coin in his workshop.

During the Great Depression, Mora created the "Carmel Dollar" as part of Carmel's program, offering unemployed residents scrip for public service, exchangeable for groceries and essentials; a three-cent stamp on the certificate's back acknowledged their efforts. When full, merchants accepted the certified scrip for goods or a dollar.

Architect Robert Stanton collaborated closely with Mora on multiple projects. In 1937, Stanton was the architect for the Monterey County Courthouse, which incorporated Mora's bas-relief panels, column caps, and figurative heads on both the building's exterior and its interior courtyard.

On July 22, 1922, for the opening day of the Carmel Woods subdivision, Mora had carved and painted a wooded statue of Padre Junípero Serra, which was installed within a small wooden shrine, surrounded by plants and a pair of wooden benches at the entrance to the development, at the intersection of Camino del Monte and Alta Avenue.

In 1925, he designed the commemorative half dollar for the California Diamond Jubilee. During this period he also illustrated a number of books, made large murals, and published charts, maps (cartes) and diagrams of the West and Western themes. Beginning in 1937, Mora wrote and illustrated children's books about the West. In 1939, a Works Progress Administration project was completed, with Mora bas-relief sculpture adorning the King City High School Auditorium building.

=== Military service and military artworks ===
Jo Mora seen here in his Army uniform, posing with his son Jo Mora Jr., near the Citizens' Military Training Camp in Monterey. Around 1925.

Mora joined the United States Army during World War I, where he reached the rank of Major, commanding a field artillery unit. He was never deployed to Europe, but he remained in the service for many years after the war. He also translated Indigenous and Native American languages for the US Army Signal Corp. Every summer, he was one of two primary commanders of the Citizens' Military Training Camp at Monterey. Resulting from this military service came his famous illustrations in the annual yearbook for the CMTC in Monterey, The Bear-Cat Musketeer. He also illustrated the post newspaper for Camp Zachary Taylor. He served in the 91st Training Division.

=== Pebble Beach ===
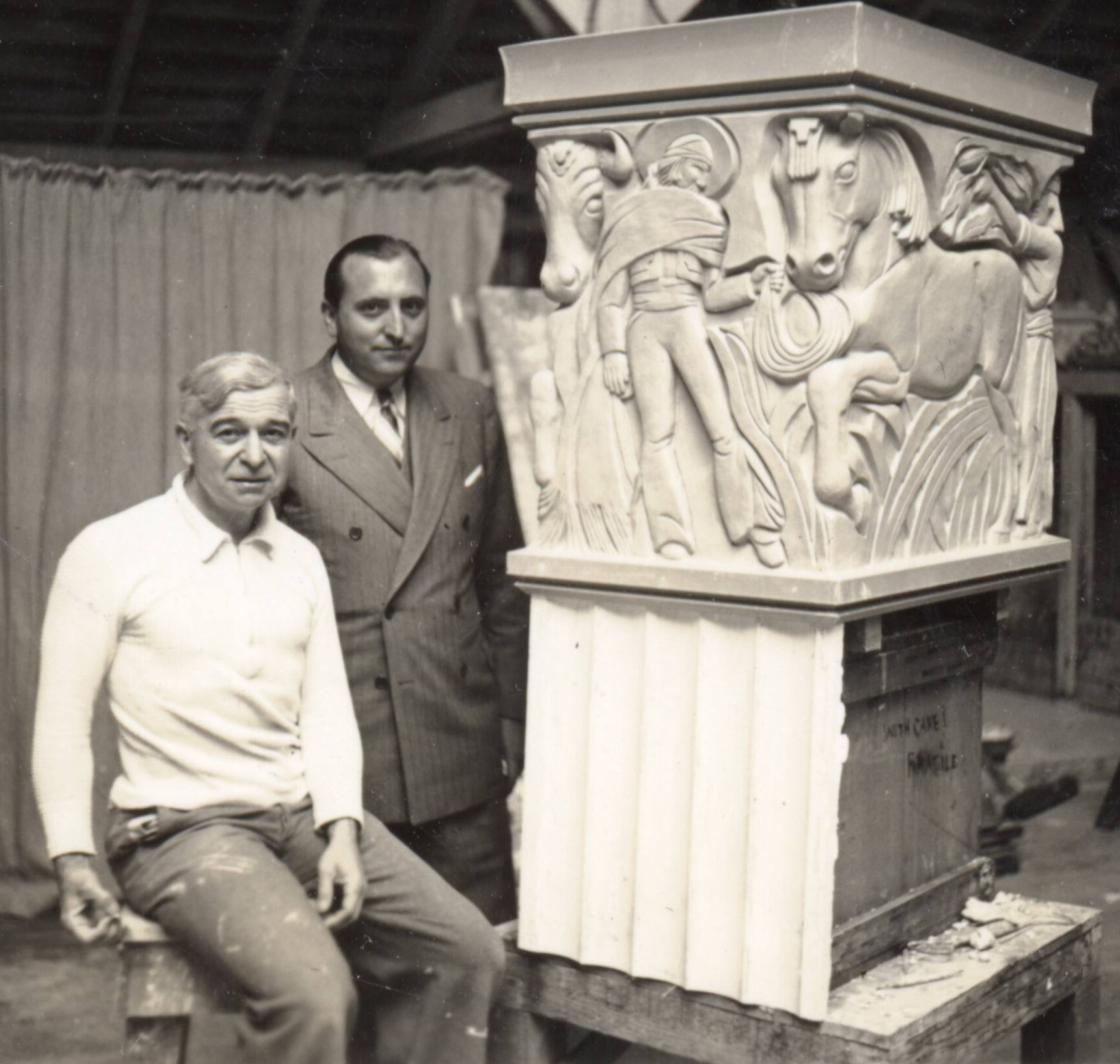
Jo Mora and Robert Stanton.

In 1931 Jo, his wife, and daughter Patricia moved to nearby Pebble Beach into a newly built home. Five years later in the adjoining large studios he completed his massive diorama, Discovery of the San Francisco Bay by Portola, for the California Pavilion at the 1939-40 Golden Gate International Exposition on Treasure Island. At a length of almost 100 feet, with 64 sculptures of Spaniards and Indians and over 200 animals, it was said "to surpass anything of its kind at the Fair." He fashioned smaller dioramas for the Will Rogers Memorial Museum in Claremore, Oklahoma, and the Sutter's Fort Museum in Sacramento, California.

In 1928, Mora made the "El Paseo" sculpture in the courtyard of the El Paseo Building on Dolores Street and 7th Avenue in Carmel. It is a terracotta sculpture of a Californio man and a Señorita woman.

In the early 1930s, Mora was commissioned by Earl F. Graft to decorate the Carmel Dairy Building in Carmel. Mora made three large interior dairy murals above a soda fountain (no longer present) and a sculptured a metal lamp in the shape of a cowbell that still hangs above the buildings front door. He showed animal figures dressed as humans, many recognizable as local Carmel residents. He also designed the menus, Christmas cards, and milk bottles, with these animal characterizations, and a cow that served as the logo. The Santa Rosa Republican described Mora's work with an article having the title: "Carmel's Prosaic Dairy is Art."

Between 1908 and the late 1940s his sculptures, illustrations, watercolors and etchings were frequently exhibited across the United States.

== Death ==
Mora died October 10, 1947, in Monterey, California. His last book, Californios, which was devoted to the life of the rancheros of Alta California, was published posthumously.

== Gallery ==
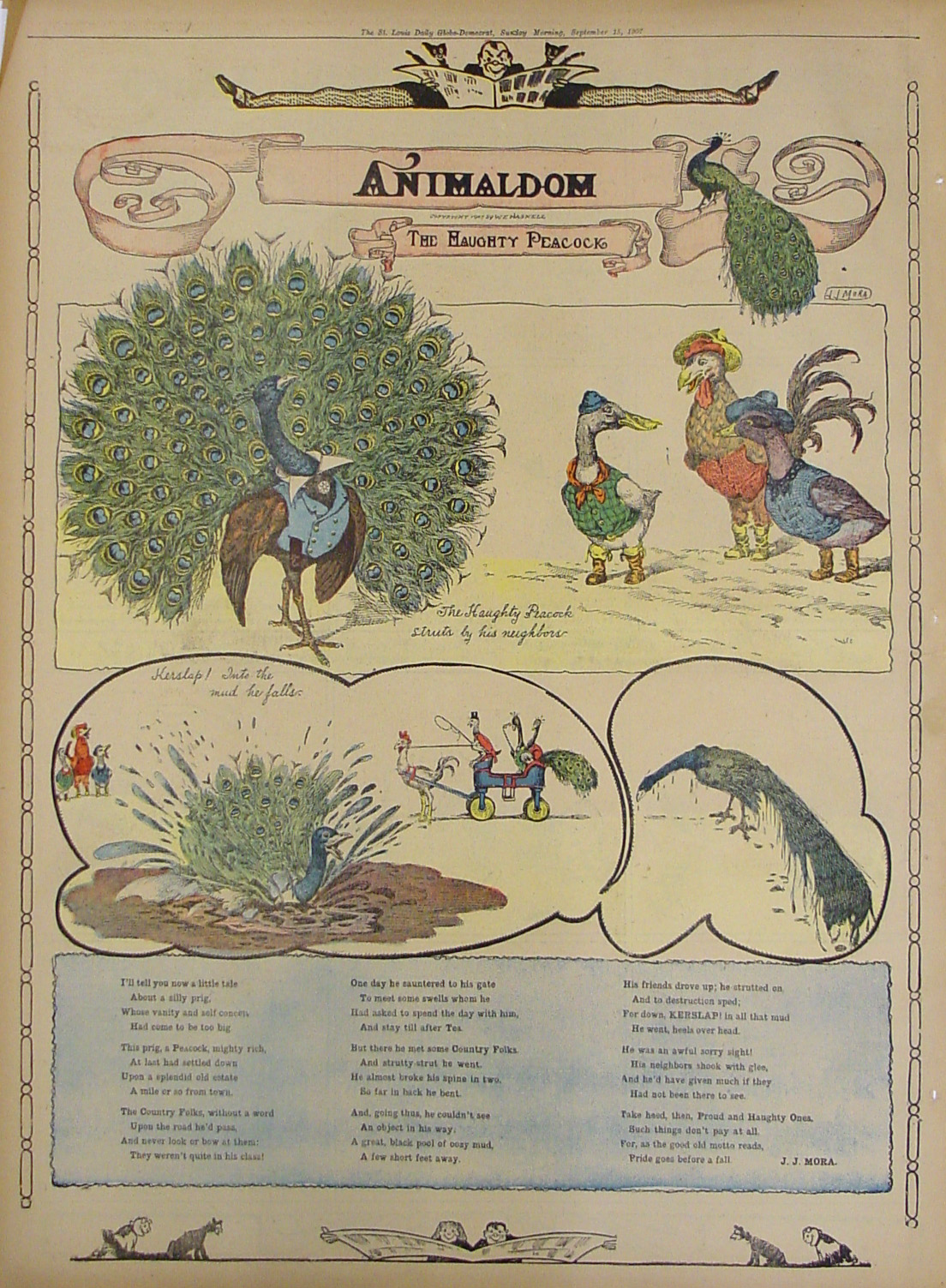
In 1907, Mora wrote and illustrated the comic strip Animaldom

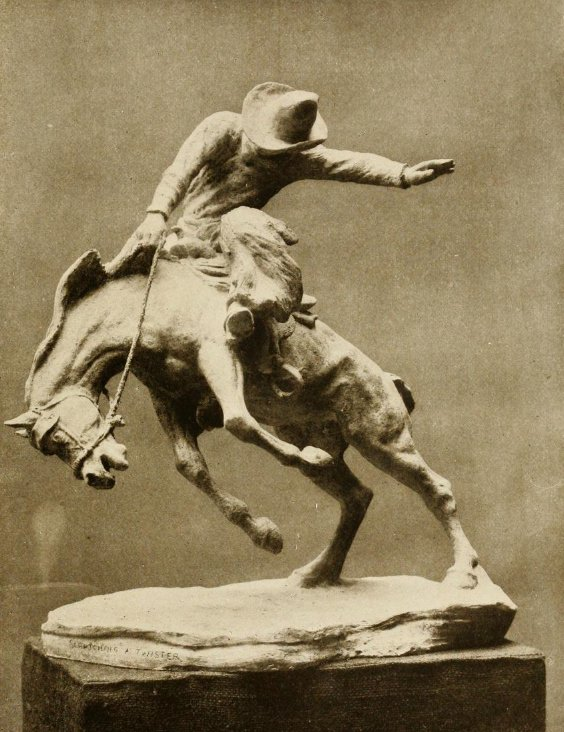
Scratching A Twister, 1915

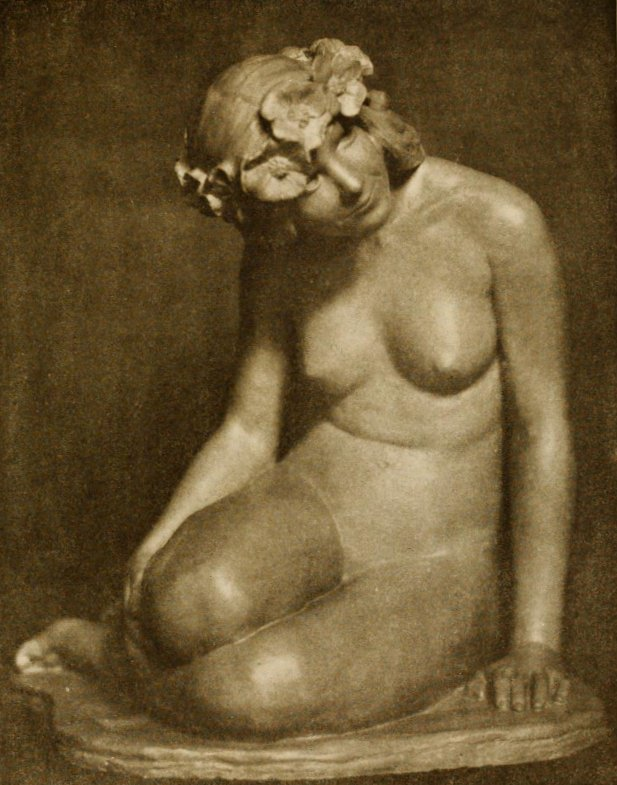
Poppy Girl, 1915

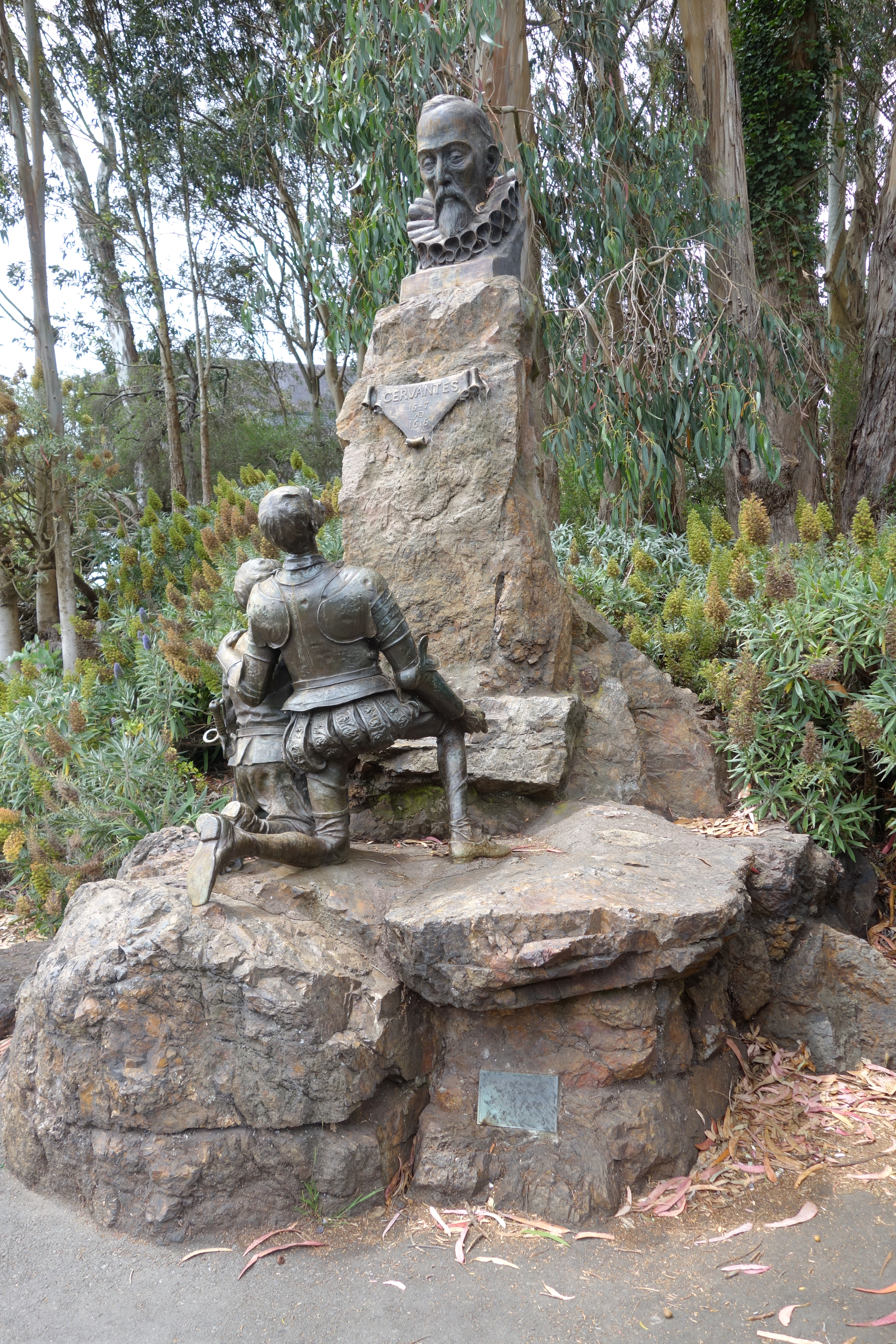
Don Quixote Memorial, Golden Gate Park, 1916

Bret Harte Memorial,
Bohemian Club,
San Francisco,
1919

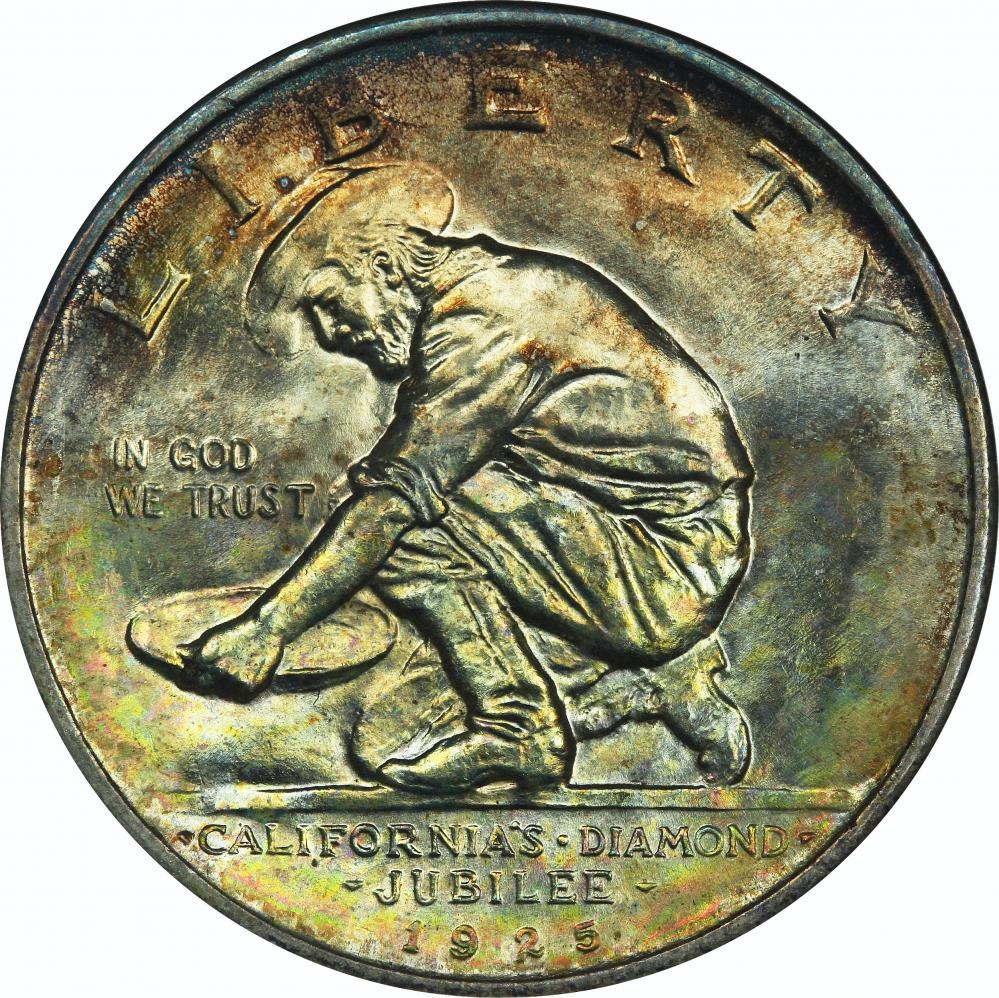
California Diamond Jubilee half dollar, 1925

Cypress at Point Lobos, 1926

Dawn and the Dons, 1916

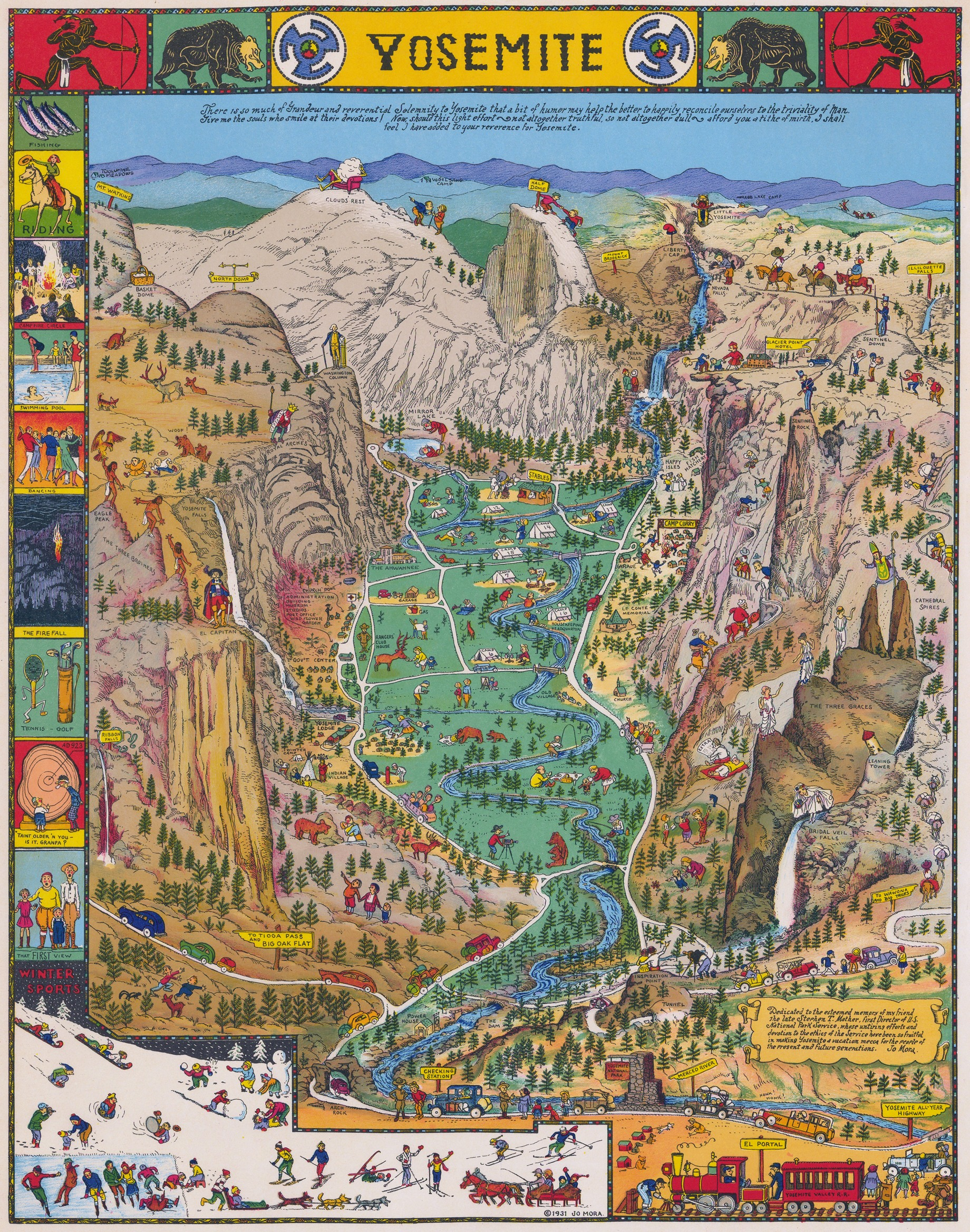
Yosemite map, 1931

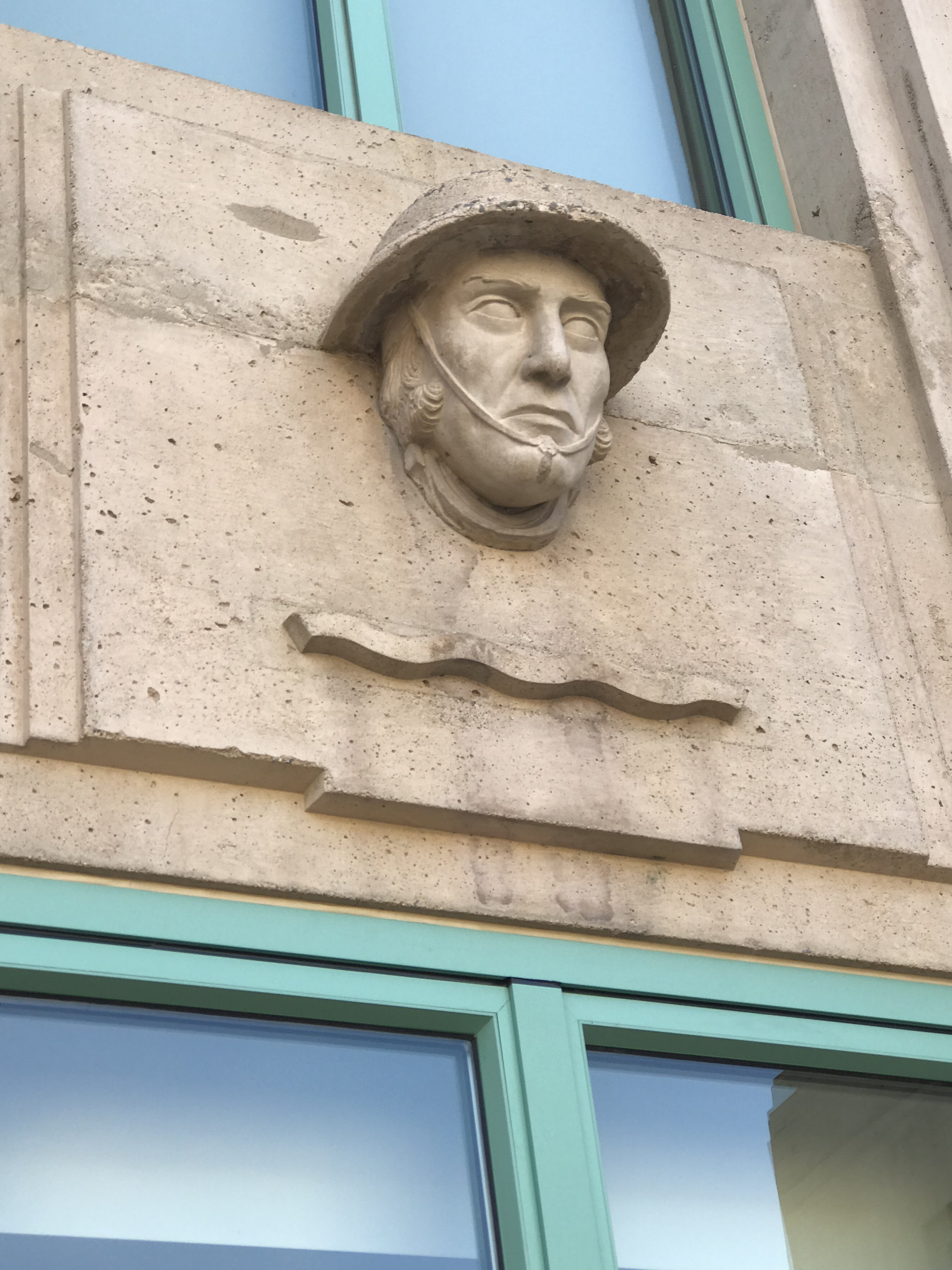
Monterey County Court House,
Salinas, California,
1937

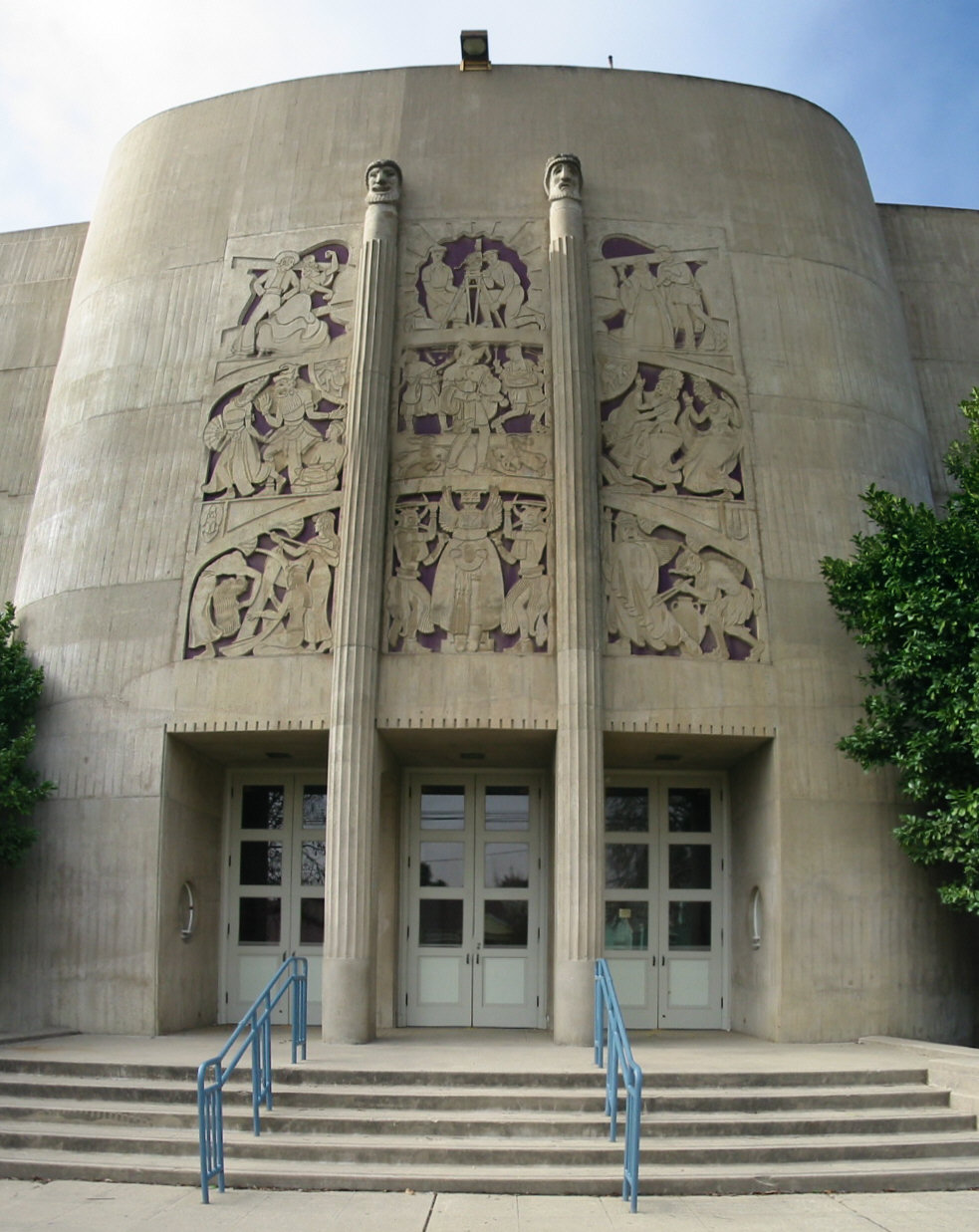
Facade,
Robert Stanton Theater,
King City High School, 1939

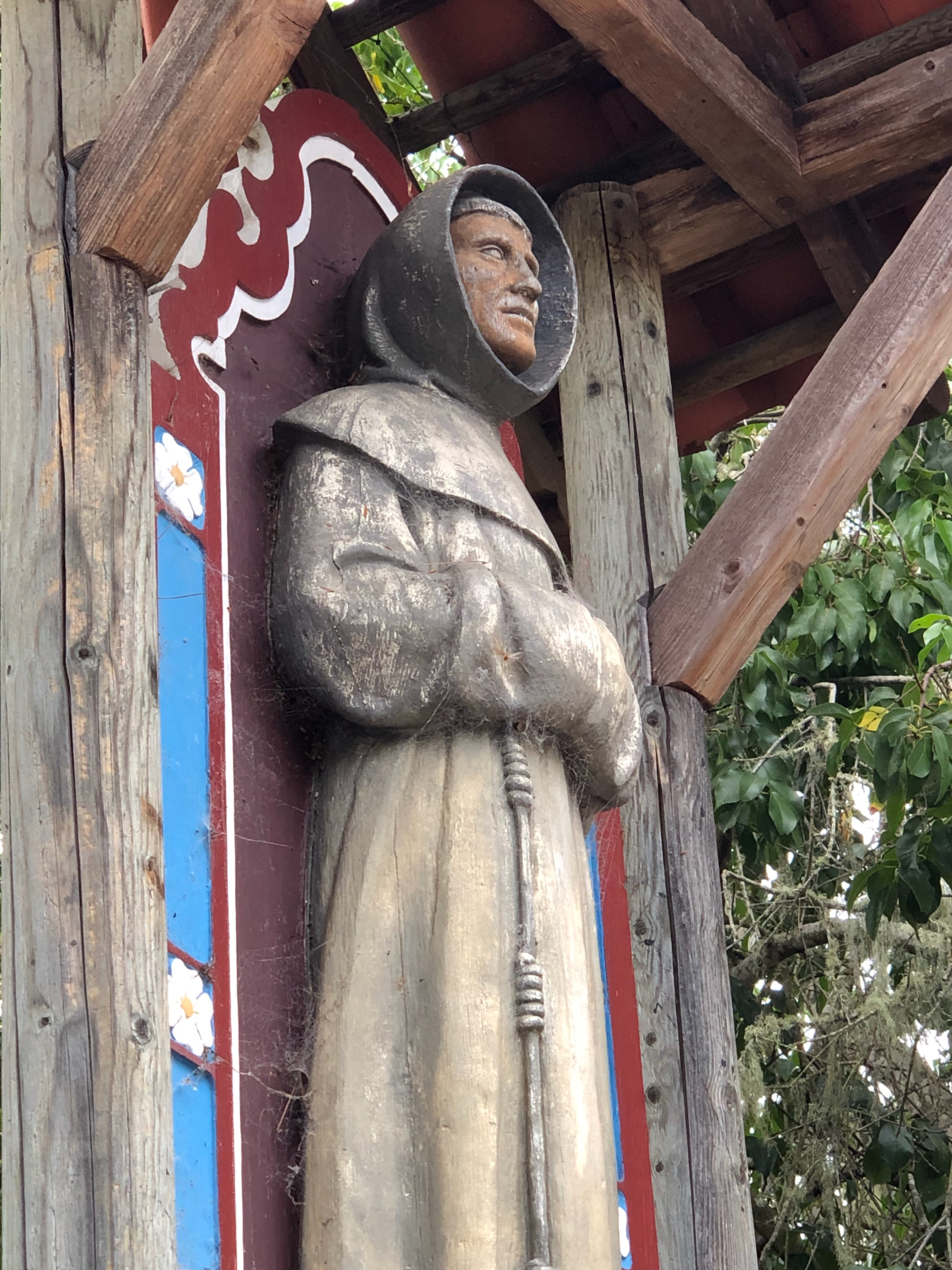
Statue of Junipero Serra in Carmel Woods

== Museum catalogs ==
- The Year of the Hopi: Paintings and Photographs by Joseph Mora, 1904-'06, Smithsonian Institution, Washington, D. C., 1979
- Jo Mora: Artist and Writer, Monterey Museum of Art, 1998
- Back to the Drawing Board with Artist Jo Mora, Monterey History and Art Association, Monterey, CA, 2003

== Bibliography ==
- When I Get Wound Up Writing I'm a Bad Article to Squelch: The Written Words of Jo Mora by Peter Hiller. (2008) ISBN 0-615-23139-X.
- The Life and Times of Jo Mora: Iconic Artist of the American West by Peter Hiller. Published by the Book Club of California, San Francisco, CA. October 2019. ISBN 978-0-692-05342-3.
- The Life and Times of Jo Mora: Iconic Artist of the American West by Peter Hiller. Published by Gibbs-Smith, Layton, Utah. April, 2021. ISBN 978-1-423-65735-4 (Hardcover)
