= Robert Stanton (architect) =

American architect (1900–1983)

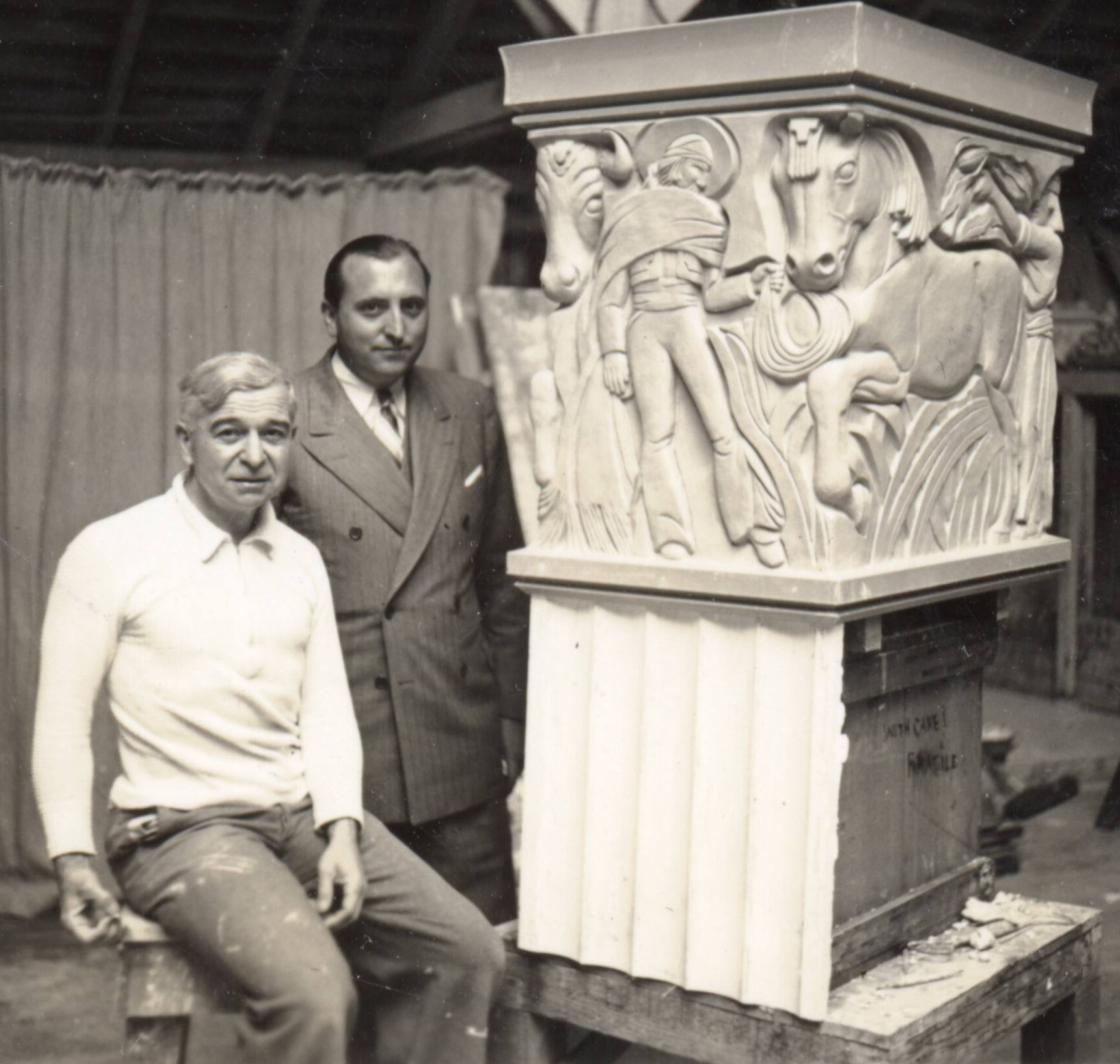
- Jo Mora (left) and Robert Stranton (right)
- Born: Robert George Stanton; 1900; Detroit, Michigan, US
- Died: September 1, 1983 (aged 82–83); Carmel Valley, California, US
- Occupation: Architect
- Spouse: Virginia Young
- Buildings: Monterey County Court House; King City Joint Union High School Auditorium

Robert Stanton (1900–1983) was an American architect. A resident of Carmel-by-the-Sea, California, he practiced primarily in the central California coastal region, and was responsible for a variety of eclectic buildings, most notably the Monterey County Court House and the King City Joint Union High School Auditorium, both listed on the National Register of Historic Places. He worked closely with sculptor Joseph Jacinto Mora on several of his projects.

== Early life ==
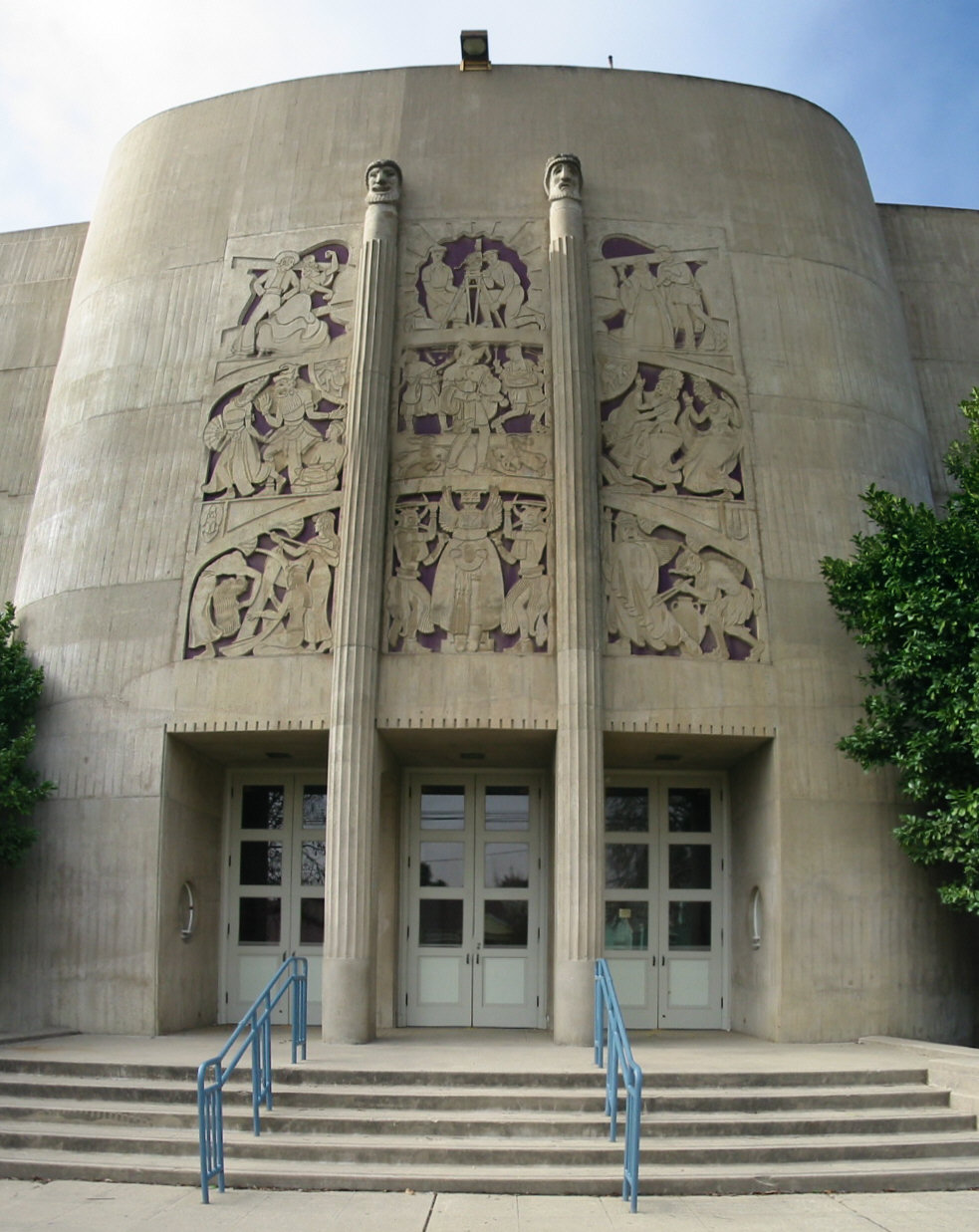
King City High School Auditorium

Stanton was born in Detroit, Michigan in 1900. His mother was a singer in the B.O. Whitney Opera Company. Stanton joined the U.S. Navy during World War I, then graduated from the Manual Arts High School in Los Angeles, California. From there he went on to architectural studies at the University of California, Berkeley from 1921 to 1923, where he was involved in theater productions. Following his studies he went on a grand tour of Europe.

== Career ==
On returning to the United States he worked in Pasadena, California for architect Wallace Neff, gaining licenses for architecture and real estate. In 1925, Stanton's office building in downtown Carmel on Monte Verde Street and Ocean Avenue was constructed by builder Fred Ruhl. This building became part of the complex of buildings, known as the Normandy Inn. The buildings included retails shop and office along the southwest corner of Ocean Avenue and Monte Verde Street. In 1926, Stranton designed the Ethel P. Young Spanish Eclectic House on the southwest corner of Carmelo and 11th Avenue in Carmel.

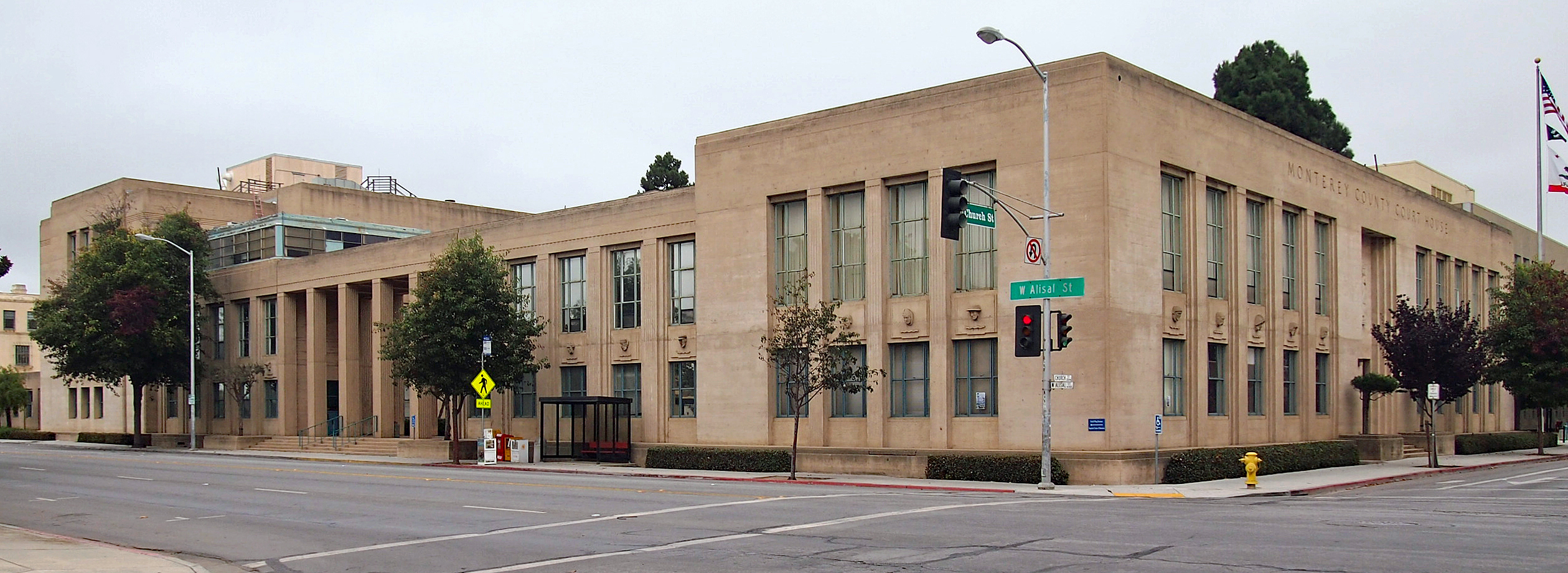
Monterey County Courthouse

In 1935 Stanton opened an office in the Hotel Del Monte in Monterey, establishing a practice that included school and hospital work in the Monterey area and across the San Joaquin Valley. He collaborated closely with sculptor Joseph Jacinto Mora (1876–1947) on multiple projects. In 1937, Stanton was the architect for the Monterey County Courthouse, which incorporated Mora's bas-relief panels, column caps, and figurative heads on both the building's exterior and its interior courtyard.

In addition to the Monterey County Court House and the King City High School Auditorium, Stanton designed schools in Monterey, the San Benito County Hospital, the Salinas General Hospital, and buildings at Fort Ord.

He supervised the construction of homes for Bob Hope, King C. Gillette, Fredric March, and King Vidor. One of the most notable work was the mansion "Pickfair' in Veverly Hills, for Douglas Fairbanks Sr. and Mary Pickford.

He was president of the Monterey County Symphony Association, the Monterey Museum of Art, Cumminty Chest, Monterey History and Art Association, the Old Monterey Bicentennial, and the Monterey Chapter of the American Institute of Architects.

Stanton met his wife Virginia Young (1903-1994) at University of California, Berkeley. They married on December 8, 1922 in Solano County, California. They had three children.

== Death ==
Stanton died at his home in Carmel Valley on September 1, 1983, at the age of 83.

== See also ==
- List of Historic Buildings in Carmel-by-the-Sea
- Timeline of Carmel-by-the-Sea, California
