= Visual journalism =

Combination of content and visuals to convey information

Visual journalism is the practice of strategically combining words and images to convey information.

== Overview ==
Visual journalism is premised upon the idea that at a time of accelerating change, often words cannot keep pace with concepts. Visual journalism incorporates ancient symbols that resonate with humans across cultures and time and conveys meaning instantaneously at a deep level.

Visual journalism is an outgrowth of the practice of graphic facilitation and recording that began entering corporate board rooms, conferences, and think tank meetings in the 1970s with the leadership of David Sibbet, founder of The Grove Consultants International. But its roots date back to ancient cave paintings and carry forward in the work of designers, architects, and engineers. Only recently has interactive visualization of this sort moved out into common use in a variety of group engagements. The scholarly father of this visual form of communication is Robert Horn, Ph.D., a fellow at Stanford University and author of the book Visual Language.

Visual journalism is not a series of symbols with precise meanings but rather images that suggest complex meanings and, in the Egyptian tradition of the cartouche, contain words. The symbols do not simply represent but participate in the meaning and, in combination with evocative phrases, are designed to provoke creative thinking. Visual language is one tool described by author Daniel Pink in his book A Whole New Mind for the emerging "conceptual age" where people must tolerate ambiguity and communicate quickly, often before concepts are ready to be captured in traditional writing.

== Projects ==
- 2015 "People's Republic of Bolzano", Free University of Bozen-Bolzano
- 2016 "Europa Dreaming", Free University of Bozen-Bolzano
- 2021 "Glocal Climate Change", European Data Journalism Network and Sheldon.studio
- 2023 "Mapping Diversity", European Data Journalism Network and Sheldon.studio

== See also ==
- Broadcast journalism
- Comics journalism
- Photojournalism
- Video journalism
- News design
