= Statues of Junípero Serra (Ventura, California) =

1936 Federal Art Project in Ventura, California

Father Serra statue
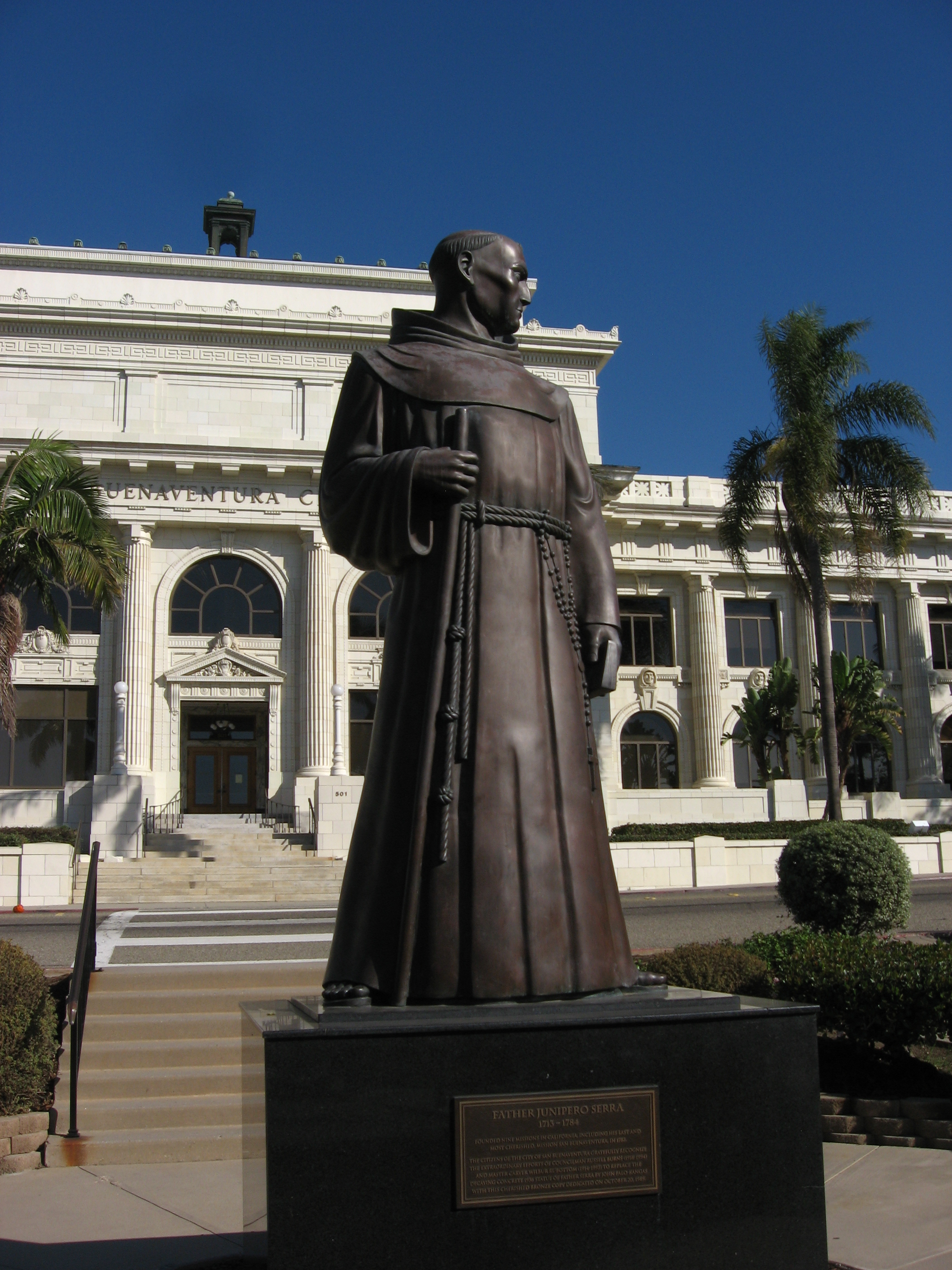
- Bronze cast in front of Ventura City Hall in 2009
- Artist: Uno John Palo Kangas
- Year: 1936
- Medium: Clay, concrete, wood, and bronze
- Location: Garden of Mission San Buenaventura, Ventura, California; 34°16′52″N 119°17′51″W

The Father Serra statue at the Mission San Buenaventura in Ventura, California, representing Junípero Serra, the founder of the mission, was commissioned by Ventura County through the Works Progress Administration as part of the Federal Art Project in 1935. This statue, made of concrete from a clay model by Uno John Palo Kangas, was originally placed in 1936 in a prominent location in a public park across the street from the Ventura County Courthouse. After the Courthouse was repurposed as Ventura City Hall, the statue was designated as City of Ventura Historic Landmark No. 3 in 1974. As deterioration of the concrete statue became a concern, a wood replica was created by local carvers and used to make a bronze cast. The concrete statue was replaced by the bronze cast in 1989. The wood replica was set in the atrium of the city hall for public display.

The public display of statuary honoring Serra has been a source of controversy, particularly among those alleging that Serra was responsible for the suppression of the culture of Chumash people. The city council decided in 2020 to remove the bronze statue and the wood replica from public display. The bronze sculpture was installed in the mission garden in 2024.

== Description ==
The statue, standing nine feet four inches (2.84 m) in height, shows Serra standing with his head facing to the left and wearing a Franciscan cassock with cowl, sandals, and a rope belt (or cincture), a rosary hanging from the belt, a book in his left hand, and a walking stick (or staff) in his right hand.

== History ==
In 1935, Uno John Palo Kangas (1904–1957), a sculptor born in Finland and raised in Michigan, was commissioned by Ventura County and the Works Progress Administration to create a statue of Serra as part of the Federal Art Project. Kangas was paid $5,000 for his work. Kangas had gained some acclaim in 1935 for a heroic statue of a Civilian Conservation Corps worker titled "Conservation of Man and Nature" that was installed at Griffith Park in Los Angeles.

=== The clay sculpture ===
Kangas posing in 1936 with his original clay sculpture

Kangas began by visiting the Santa Barbara and Ventura missions to study images of Serra and to learn about his life and style of dress. He also made multiple sketches in preparation for the work. The sculpting process began with the creation of a full-size clay model; the clay model took four months to complete and was built at Kangas's studio at 3929 Fountain Avenue in Los Angeles. The clay sculpture was built around a frame of wood and chicken wire which Kangas then covered with layers of clay. According to a contemporary of the artist, Kangas used Meiners Oaks resident Gordon Douglas as a model for the face of Serra. In August 1936, the Los Angeles Times published on its front page a large photograph of Kangas posing with the clay sculpture.

The disposition of the original clay sculpture is unknown. A newspaper story from April 1938 suggests that the original clay model may have been loaned to a museum in Butte, Montana, for an exhibition on scale models of sculpture. The story announced: "'Fray Junipero Serra', by John Palo-Kangas, one of the scale models of sculpture to be shown at the Butte Art Center, beginning on April 21st, is in the original at the Ventura county courthouse at San Buenaventura, Calif."

=== The concrete sculpture ===
Kangas built a breakaway mold of the clay sculpture using plaster of Paris. The mold was placed in front of the courthouse and a scaffolding was built around the mold. Kangas gathered sand and gravel from the Ventura River, which he used to make a concrete aggregate material that he poured on location into the mold. After the concrete hardened, the mold was removed and Kangas smoothed the outer surface.

On November 27, 1936, Kangas's concrete sculpture was unveiled in prominent location in a small public park across the street from the Ventura County Courthouse. The unveiling ceremony was attended by Kangas, Governor Frank Merriam, Mayor George A. Newell Jr., and other notable persons. In his speech, Gov. Merriam said: "A beautiful statue is about to be made visible, exemplifying the spirit of this pioneering priest – noble, brave and holy – a patriot of patriots." After the Courthouse was repurposed as Ventura City Hall, the small park was included in the property transfer. The concrete Father Serra statue was designated as City of Ventura Historic Landmark No. 3 in 1974.

By the 1980s, the statue had deteriorated from years of exposure to Ventura's salt air and from the pooling of rainwater in the collar of the figure's robe, which formed a basin. In addition, the statue was vandalized with paint and the City sandblasted the statue, damaging its smooth outer layer and accelerating the decay. The statue was removed from its pedestal in September 1989 to make room for installation of the bronze cast. The City planned to store the concrete statue until the completion of a planned farm implements museum, where it was to be installed. The inauguration of this museum was delayed when its chief proponent, Bob Pfeiler, became ill. In 1996, the concrete statue was discovered by a reporter for the Los Angeles Times in an industrial storage yard operated by Oilfield Service & Trucking Company (OST) along Ventura Avenue. A crane from OST had been used to remove the statue in 1989 and the statue was to have been temporarily stored at the OST yard. In 1997, the Historic Preservation Alliance of San Buenaventura put the "Original Junipero Serra statue, boxed up in an industrial yard at 2951 N. Ventura Ave." on a list of the top ten most endangered historical sites. As of April 2018, the concrete statue remained at the OST yard in a decaying wooden crate.

=== The wooden replica ===
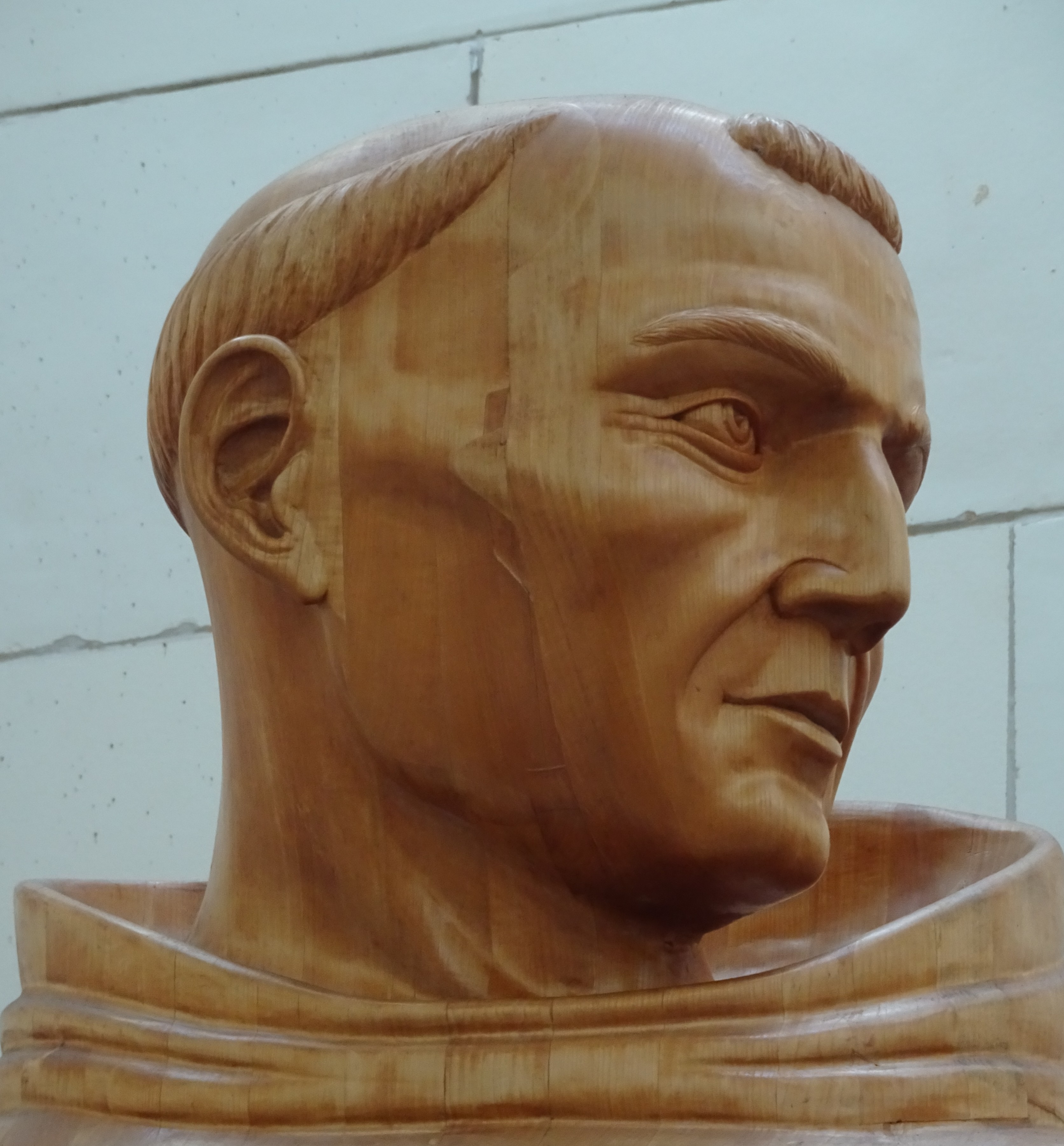
Close-up of head from wooden replica

Ownership of the concrete statue passed from Ventura County to the City of Ventura in 1971. In 1983, Ventura City Councilman Russell Burns, a mechanical engineer, presented a report to the city council describing the deterioration of the statue and concluding that the statue "in the not too distant future will fall apart." The City in 1984 commissioned studies of the statue by an art conservator, an engineering firm, and a concrete expert. The studies reached the conclusion that the statue should be moved inside and that it was too fragile to be copied by molding.

Based on the findings, Councilman Burns proposed the creation of a wood replica of the statue which could then be used as a model for a bronze cast to be put in place of the decaying concrete statue. In 1986, Burns's proposal was unanimously adopted by the Ventura City Council. The City loaned an initial sum of $15,000 to begin the process to be repaid by local boosters who raised more than $100,000 through the sale of limited-edition 18-inch (46 cm) bronze replicas (hand-tooled by Charles Kubilos), posters/lithographs, and T-shirts, hats, and pins bearing the phrase "I Support the Serra Statue".

The reproduction process began by taking precise measurements of all aspects of the concrete statue, using 1,782 points of reference. According to a book written on the process, "more than 4,000 charts, drawings, grids, and photographs were made from the measurements". Master carver Wilbur Rubottom and a team of 16 carvers from the Channel Islands Carvers club then painstakingly created the wood replica in a studio at the old livery building on Palm Street in Ventura. The carving began with large strips of basswood from linden trees in a Great Lakes forest that were glued together to form a 1,200-pound (540 kg) block. The carvers' studio was open to the public, and busloads of schoolchildren, senior citizens, and tourists visited the studio to observe the process. During the 1987 Ventura County Fair, the wood block was temporarily moved to the county fairgrounds where the carvers' work became an attraction for visitors.

The carving took 14 months, from April 1987 to June 1988. In all, 10,000 man-hours were dedicated to creating the wood replica. The city council voted to temporarily place the wood replica in the atrium of Ventura City Hall. Installed on October 7, 1988, it remained there until it was removed in 2020.

=== The bronze cast ===
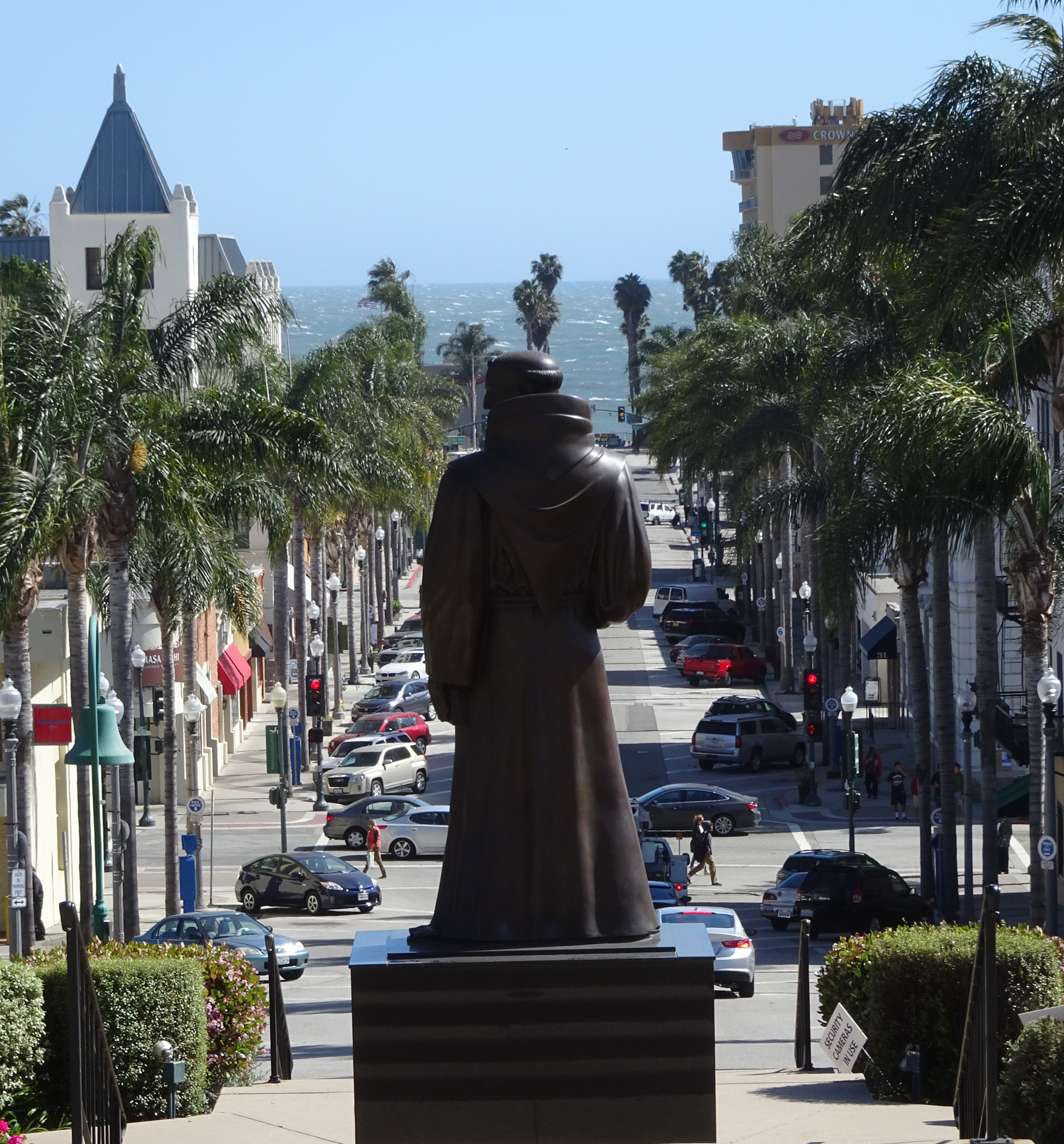
Serra statue from City Hall

In 1988, the City of Ventura accepted a $17,000 bid from a group of student artists at the California Sculpture Center at College of the Desert in Palm Desert to create a bronze cast of the sculpture using the wood replica. A group of the student artists visited the wood statue at the old livery building and made latex molds in multiple sections. The bronze figure was then cast in 20 pieces using the "lost wax" method.

The bronze cast was unveiled in front of Ventura City Hall at a ceremony on October 20, 1989, attended by more than 500 persons. The bronze cast stands on a concrete base with an outer layer of polished black granite from the Andes Mountains.

The bronze cast replaced the original concrete statue in 1989 in the small park at the top of California Street overlooking downtown Ventura and the Pacific Ocean. A plaque at the base of the statue states: "The citizens of the City of San Buenaventura gratefully recognize the extraordinary efforts of Councilman Russell Burns (1918–1994) and master carver Wilbur Rubottom (1914–1993) to replace the decaying concrete 1936 statue of Father Serra by John Palo-Kangas with this bronze copy dedicated on October 20, 1989."

== Reactions and disposition ==
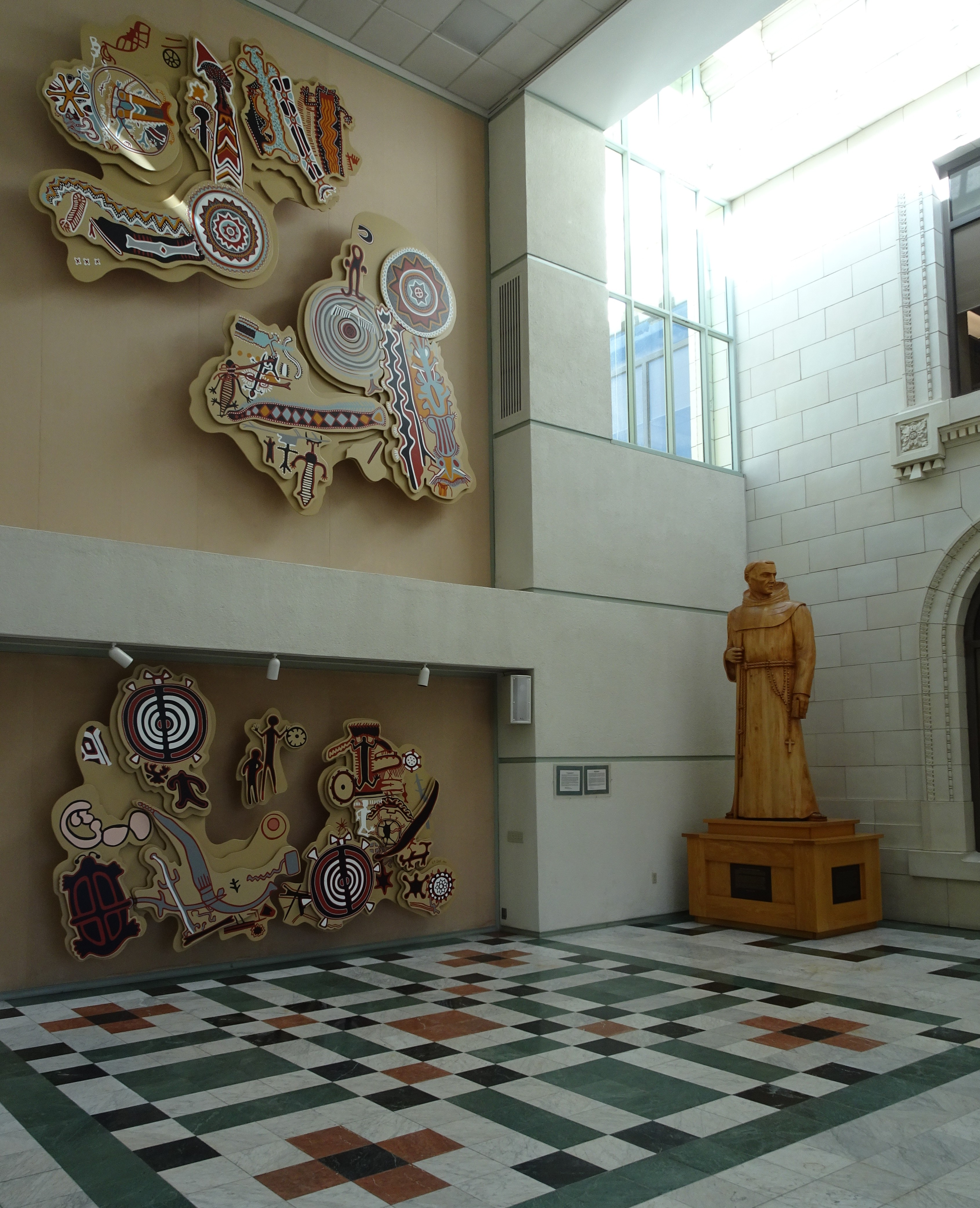
Chumash petroglyph murals and wooden Father Serra statue at Ventura City Hall

The City's plan to display the wooden replica in the atrium of Ventura City Hall was met with objections from the city art committee and the Candelaria American Indian Council. Members of the art committee felt the statue was too large and not harmonious with the design of the atrium. The City had already commissioned through the art committee a series of murals reproducing local Chumash petroglyphs in the atrium. The Indian Council objected due to Father Serra's alleged abuse and enslavement of the Chumash people. Jessica M. Roybal, the executive director of the Indian Council, said “What a slap in the face to the Indian people.” Members of the Padre Serra Parish in nearby Camarillo offered to display the wooden statue in a place of honor but were turned down. The wooden Serra statue was placed in a corner of the atrium with explanatory plaques.

In May 1980, primer paint was poured over the concrete statue; city workers sandblasted the paint from the statue. In January 1991, four glass jars of orange and blue paint were thrown at the bronze cast; the words "Spirit of Crazy Horse" and an image of a clenched fist were also spray-painted on the sidewalk at the base of the statue. In May 1992, the bronze cast's hand was painted with red paint, and a message was stenciled on the concrete below accusing Serra of having failed to honor God and claiming that Serra was a symbol of slavery to Native Americans.

Serra was canonized as a saint by Pope Francis in September 2015, drawing national attention to Ventura's Father Serra statue. In August 2017, amid the controversy over public display and vandalism of Serra statues, the Ventura County Star published an op-ed calling for the removal of such statues. The author, Rellis Smith, wrote: "To have statues such as the one in front of Ventura City Hall is a direct slap in the face of all Chumash and other Native American cultures."

In June 2020, as the national call for the removal of certain statues intensified, the mayor of Ventura, the pastor of Mission San Buenaventura and Julie Tumamait-Stenslie, the tribal chair of the Barbareño/Venureño Band of Mission Indians, issued a joint statement agreeing to take down the statue and have it "moved to a more appropriate non-public location". Tumamait-Stenslie, reacting to defenders of Serra who say he protected and cared for indigenous people, said

"He did that because we were the free labor force, the slave labor for the missions. Of course he was going to protect us. What else would he do? Go out and actually pay somebody to do the work? He had free slave labor.”

The removal proposal was overwhelmingly approved by the city council in July. Since the bronze cast had never been officially designated a historic landmark after it replaced the concrete statue, the council found that the current statue was not a historic landmark for which a review under the California Environmental Quality Act would have been required. The replica was not found to be potentially historically significant on its own.

In the early morning of July 24, construction crews removed the statue from its plinth. Organizers involved in the effort to bring down the Serra statue gathered on Juneteenth for the Solidarity Art Walk to acknowledge the involvement of several groups and what they went through. The Coalition for Historical Integrity filed a lawsuit against the city in Ventura County Superior Court. The court ruled that the city acted within its legislative prerogative when removing the statue. The Second District Court of Appeal, Division 6, upheld the ruling in 2023. The statue was installed in the Mission San Buenaventura garden in 2024.

== Widespread protests ==
Junípero Serra was a Roman Catholic Spanish priest and friar of the Franciscan Order who founded nine Spanish missions in California. In 1782, Serra founded Mission San Buenaventura, his ninth and final mission, on a site that became downtown Ventura. Objections to the public display of Serra statuary cite the mistreatment of the Native American people during the mission era. Following Serra's canonization in 2015, Serra statues were vandalized at Carmel Mission (smeared with green paint, "Saint of Genocide" written on a headstone), Monterey's Lower Presidio Historic Park (decapitated), San Fernando Mission (hands painted red and word "murderer" scrawled), Mission Santa Barbara (decapitated and covered in red paint), and San Gabriel Mission (cut with electric saw and splashed with red paint).

The attention and damage to the statues of Junípero Serra was renewed during the George Floyd protests, which expanded to include monuments of individuals associated with the genocide of indigenous peoples in the Americas. A statue in Los Angeles and another statue in San Francisco were toppled on Juneteenth. A statue in Carmel was removed for safekeeping. Mission San Luis Obispo also removed their statue from public display.

== See also ==
- City of Ventura Historic Landmarks and Districts
- Statue of Junípero Serra (disambiguation)
