= Statue of Junípero Serra =

Statue of Junípero Serra may refer to:

- Statue of Junípero Serra (Carmel-by-the-Sea, California), also known as the Serra shrine, by Jo Mora
- Statue of Junípero Serra (Los Angeles), after Ettore Cadorin's statue for the U.S. Capitol
- Statue of Junípero Serra (Monterey, California), by Peter Bisson
- Statue of Junípero Serra (Sacramento, California), by Maurice Loriaux
- Statue of Junípero Serra (San Francisco), by Douglas Tilden
- Statue of Junípero Serra (San Luis Obispo, California), by Dale Smith
- Statue of Junípero Serra (U.S. Capitol), by Ettore Cadorin
- Statues of Junípero Serra (Ventura, California), by John Palo-Kangas
