= Statue of Junípero Serra (Los Angeles) =

Statue in Los Angeles, California, U.S.

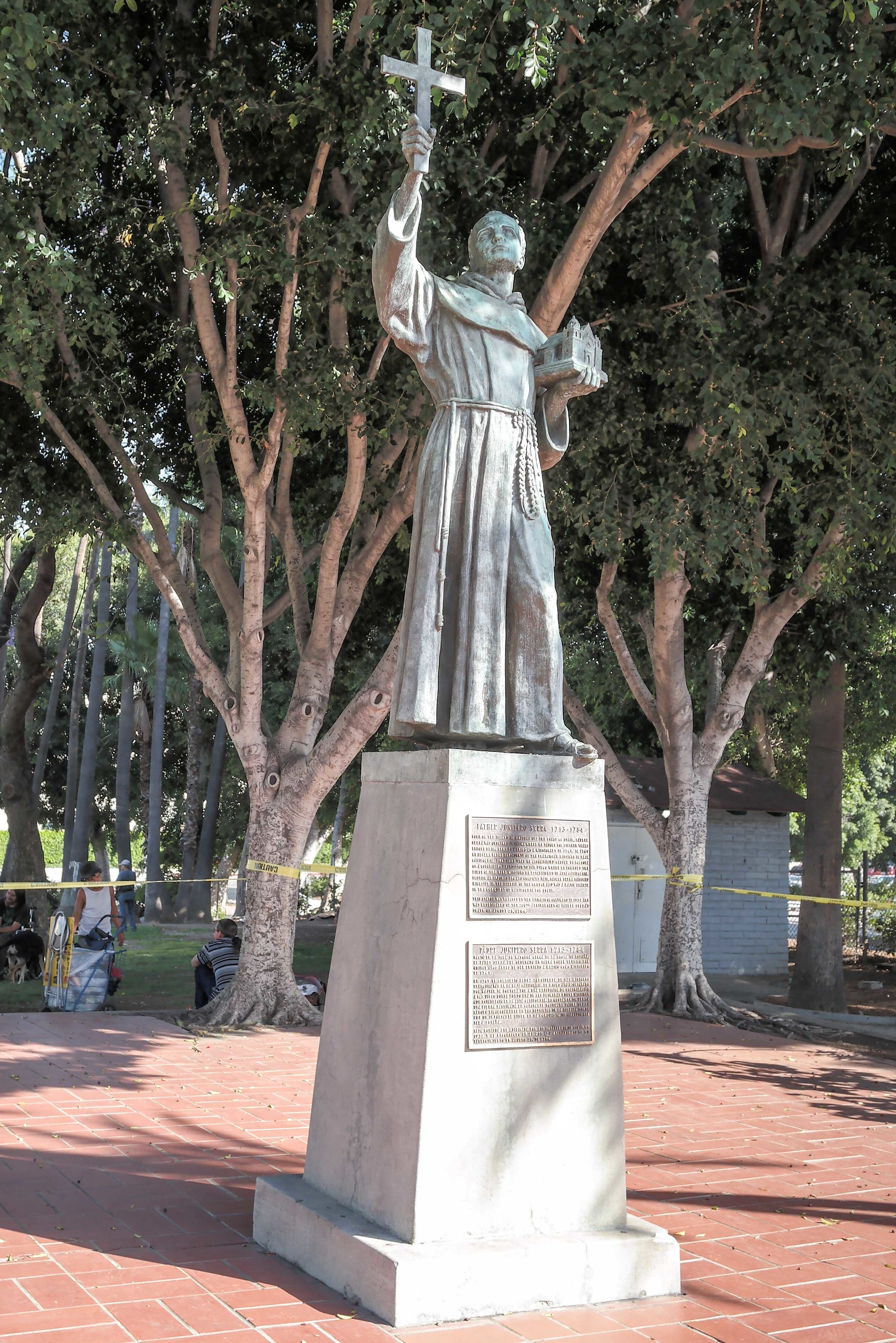
- The statue in 2014
- Artist: Ettore Cadorin (replica)
- Year: 1932
- Medium: Bronze sculpture; concrete (base)
- Subject: Junípero Serra
- Condition: In storage
- Location: Los Angeles, California, U.S.; 34.0562°N 118.2383°W

A statue of Junípero Serra (sometimes called Father Junipero Serra or Fra Junipero Serra) was installed in a portion of El Pueblo de Los Ángeles Historical Monument informally known as Father Serra Park in Los Angeles, California.

== Description ==
Located between the Santa Ana Freeway and the city's Chinatown district, the bronze sculpture of Junípero Serra, a replica of the one completed by Ettore Cadorin for the National Statuary Hall Collection in 1930, measures approximately 8' 9" × 2' 2" × 2' 4", and rests on a concrete base that measures approximately 5' 8" × 3' 8" × 3' 8".

== History ==
The memorial was installed in 1932. Some 4,000 people came for the occasion. A bronze statue by Henry Lion of the Spanish Colonial governor, Felipe de Neve, was also installed in 1932 in the park.

The artwork was surveyed by the Smithsonian Institution's "Save Outdoor Sculpture!" program in 1994.

=== Removal ===
The statue was toppled by a group consisting of members from the Tongva and Tataviam Tribal Nations and Native/Indigenous activists in solidarity with the George Floyd protests in June 2020.

The City of Los Angeles deemed the removal an act of civil disobedience. On June 30, 2020, the city introduced a motion to address controversial statues, plaques and other symbolic honorifics. The park will be renamed by the Board of Recreation and Parks Commissioners in collaboration with local tribal communities.

== See also ==
- Statue of Junípero Serra (disambiguation)
