= Statue of Junípero Serra (U.S. Capitol) =

Statue representing California in the National Statuary Hall Collection

Junípero Serra
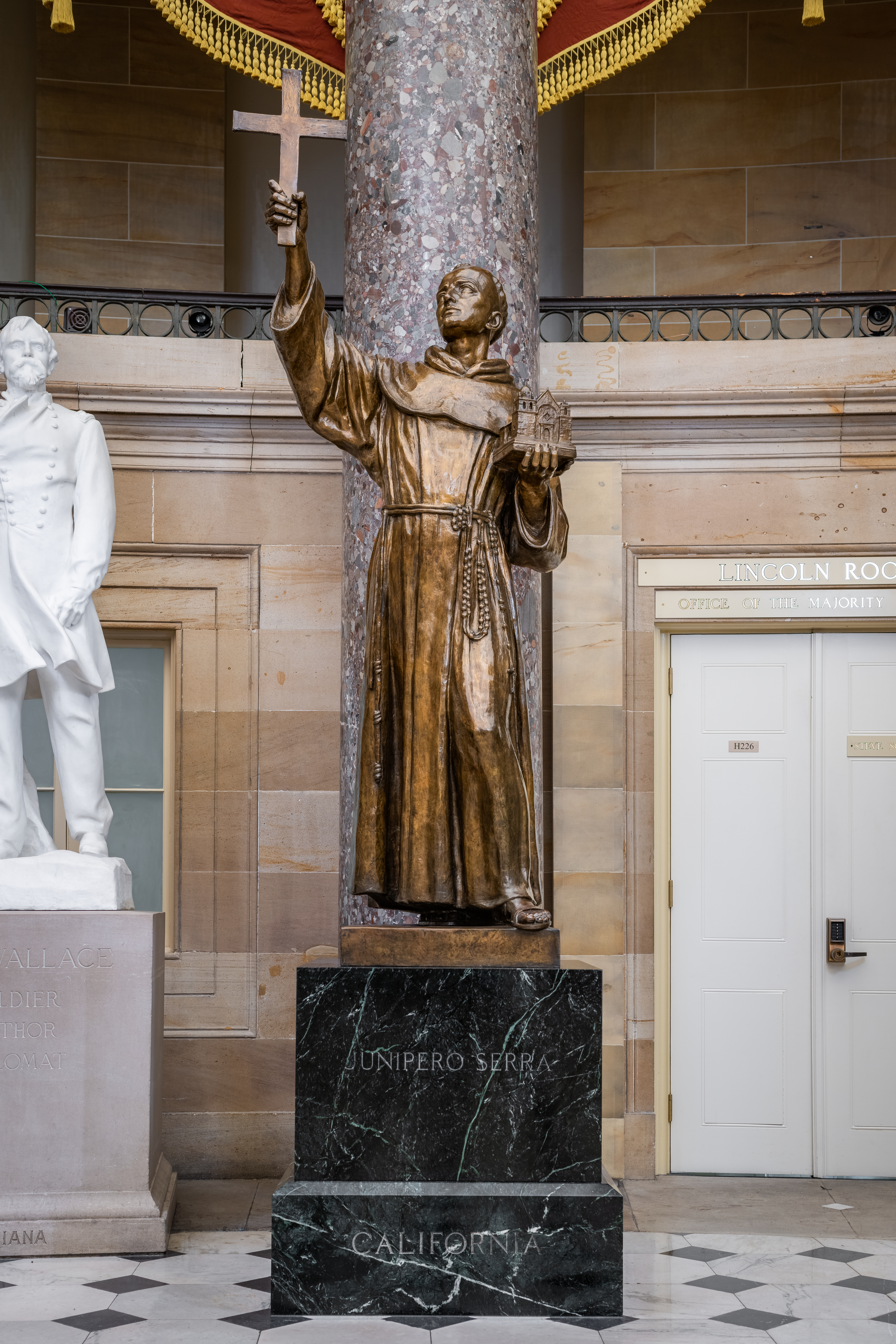
- The statue at the National Statuary Hall in 2023
- Artist: Ettore Cadorin
- Movement: Bronze sculpture
- Subject: Junípero Serra
- Location: Los Angeles, California; Washington, D.C.

Junípero Serra, or Father Junipero Serra, is a bronze sculpture depicting the Roman Catholic Spanish priest and friar Junípero Serra by Ettore Cadorin.

One statue is installed in the United States Capitol's National Statuary Hall, in Washington, D.C., as part of the National Statuary Hall Collection. It was donated by the U.S. state of California in 1931.

Another bronze statue was installed in Los Angeles in 1934.

== See also ==
- 1931 in art
- List of public art in Los Angeles
- Statue of Junípero Serra (disambiguation)
