= National Shrine of Saint Frances Xavier Cabrini =

Catholic religious shrine in Chicago, Illinois

Coordinates: 41°55′44.1″N 87°38′23.4″W

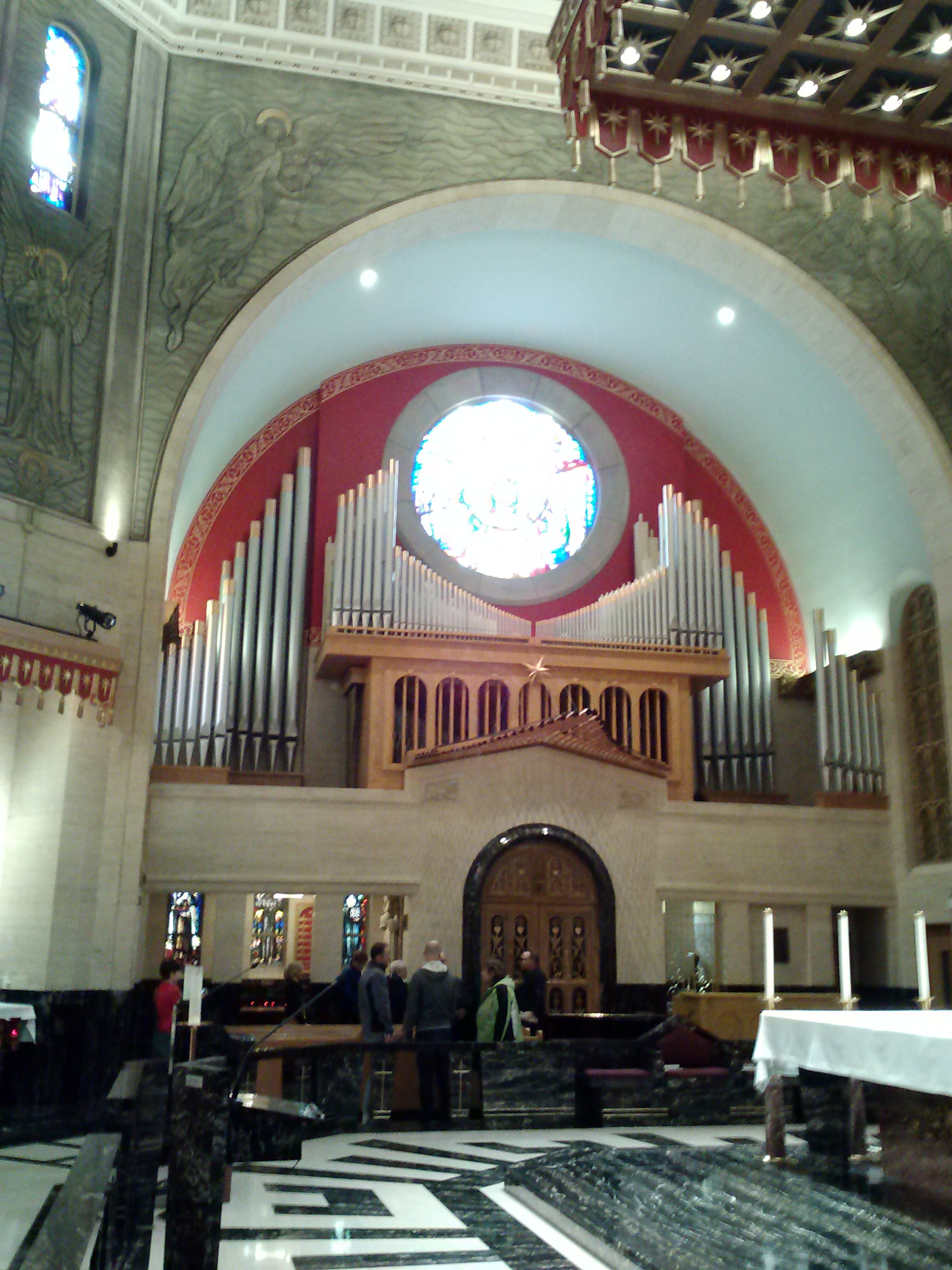
St. Francis Cabrini Shrine, Lincoln Park, Chicago

The National Shrine of Saint Frances Xavier Cabrini is a shrine in the Lincoln Park neighborhood of Chicago, Illinois, honoring the Roman Catholic saint who ministered there, Frances Xavier Cabrini. It was originally part of the now-demolished Columbus Hospital, which she founded in 1905, and where she died in 1917.

After Cabrini's death, her convent room at Columbus Hospital became a popular destination for the faithful seeking personal healing and spiritual comfort. Due to the overwhelming number of pilgrims after her canonization in 1946, the then-Archbishop of Chicago, Cardinal Samuel Stritch, commissioned a large National Shrine in her honor within the hospital complex. He dedicated the shrine in 1955.

The hospital and shrine closed in 2002, to be replaced by a high-rise development on North Lakeview Avenue, but the shrine and Cabrini's room were preserved and refurbished during the long period of demolition and construction. They were solemnly blessed and re-dedicated by Cardinal Francis George on September 30, 2012, and reopened to the public the next day. The shrine is made of gold mosaics, Carrara marble, frescoes and Florentine stained glass, functioning as a stand-alone center for prayer, worship, spiritual care and pilgrimage.

== See also ==
- St. Frances Xavier Cabrini Shrine, New York City
- Mother Cabrini Shrine, Golden, Colorado
