= Carmel Woods, California =

Unincorporated area north of Carmel-by-the-Sea, California

Carmel Woods
- Unincorporated community
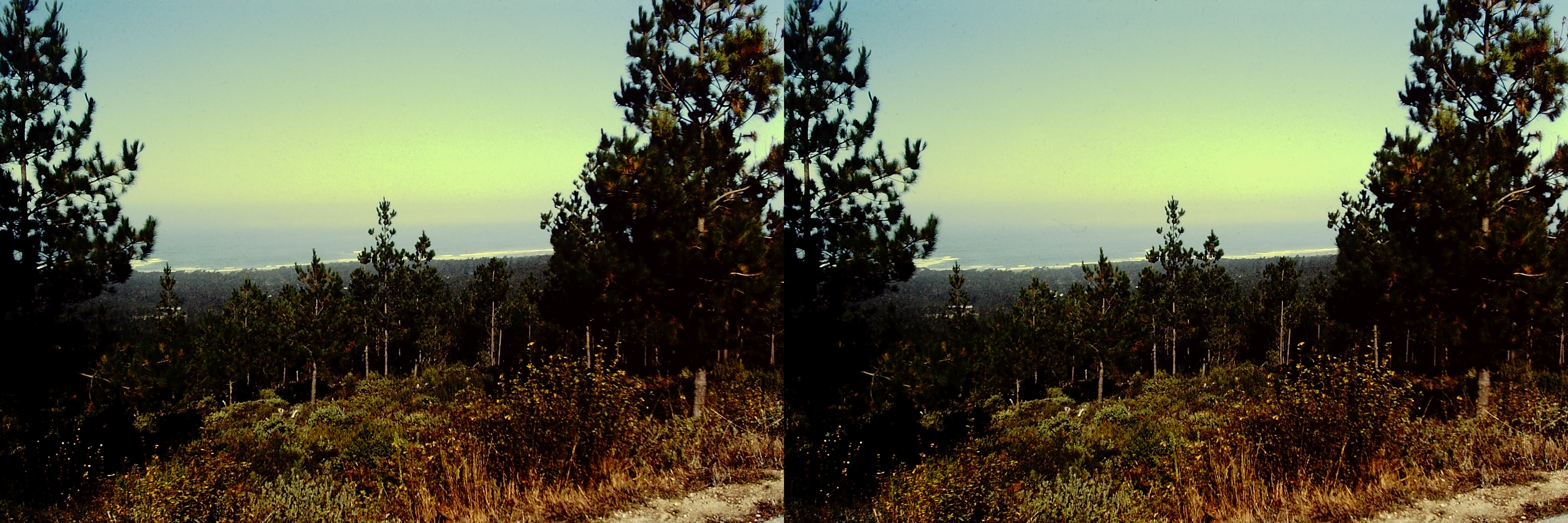
- View of the Pacific Ocean from Carmel Woods

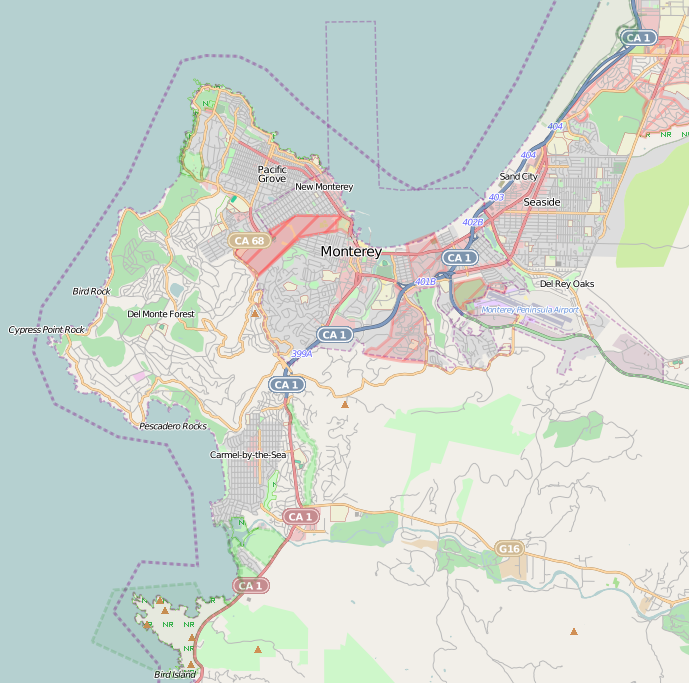
- Location within Monterey Peninsula Location within California
- Coordinates: 36.5716273°N 121.9160656°W
- Country: United States
- State: California
- County: Monterey
- Established: 1922
- Elevation: 318 ft (97 m)
- GNIS feature ID: 5334314

Carmel Woods is an unincorporated community in Monterey County, California, United States. It is located adjoining the northern city limits of Carmel-by-the-Sea and adjacent to Pebble Beach. Carmel Woods was laid out in 1922 by developer Samuel F. B. Morse (1885–1969). It included a 25-acre (0.10 km^{2}) subdivision with 119 building lots. Carmel Woods was one of three major land developments adjacent to the Carmel city limits between 1922 and 1925. The other two were the Hatton Fields, a 233 acres (94 ha) between the eastern town limit and Highway 1, and the Walker Tract to the south, which was 216 acres (87 ha) of the Martin Ranch called The Point.

== History ==
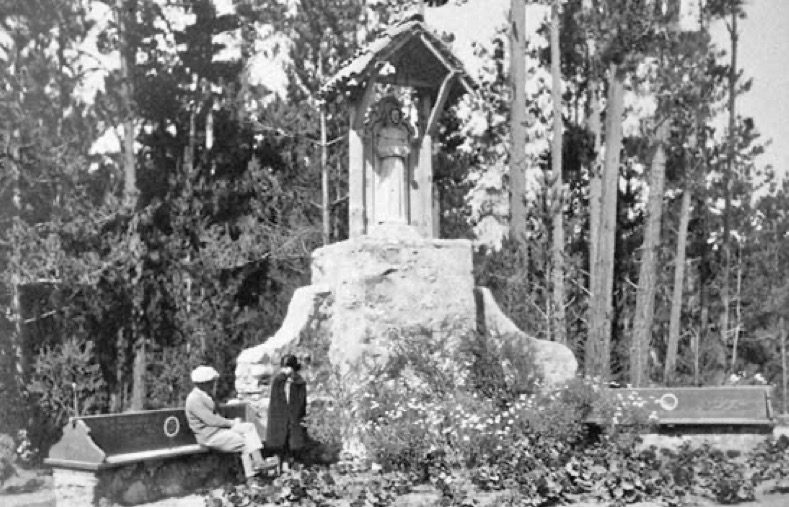
Carmel Woods with Jo Mora and his daughter Patti in 1922.

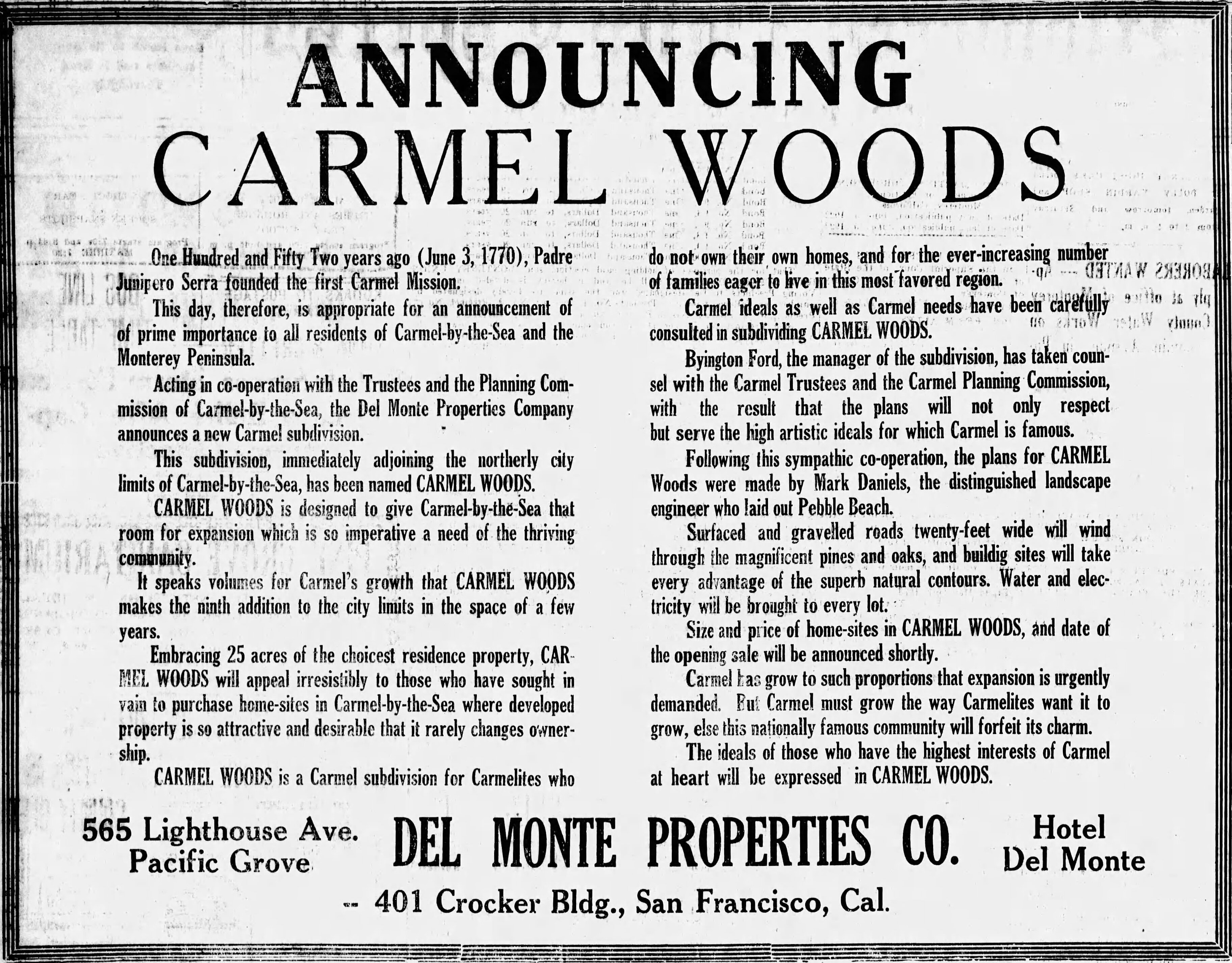
Carmel Woods 1922 Ad in the Monterey Daily Cypress.

In 1919, Samuel F. B. Morse purchased the Del Monte Properties Company, which included 25-acre (0.10 km^{2}) with 119 building lots on the north side of Carmel. Mark Daniels, a landscape engineer, was hired by Morse to draw the plans for Carmel Woods and Pebble Beach developments. On June 8, 1922, the Del Monte Properties Company, in cooperation with the town Trustees and Planning Commission of Carmel-by-the-Sea, announced a new Carmel subdivision to opened on July 22, 1922.

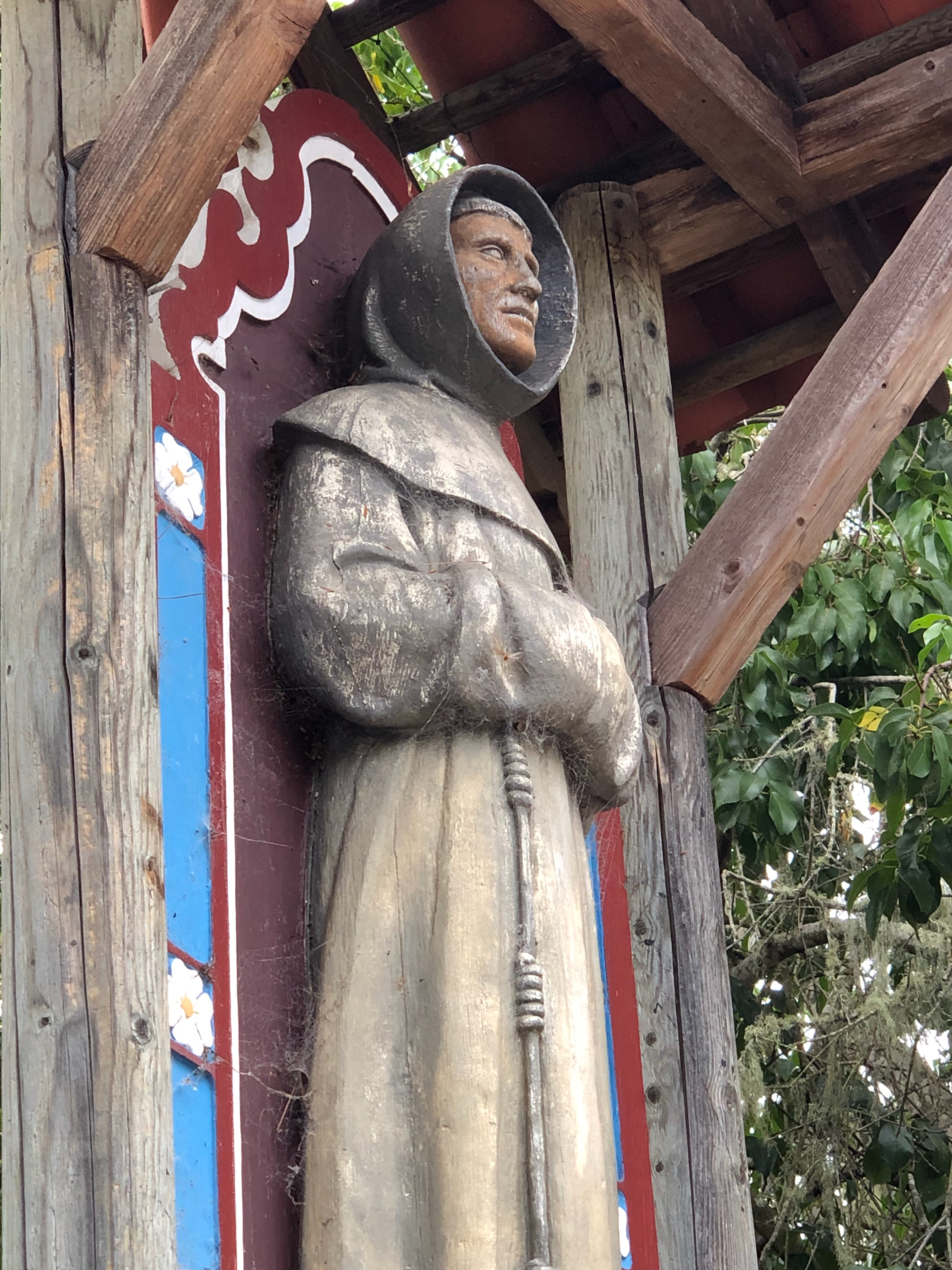
Statue of Junipero Serra in Carmel Woods.

A shrine with a wooded statue of Padre Junípero Serra was installed at the entrance to the development, at the intersection of Camino del Monte and Alta Avenue in the community of Carmel Woods. The statue was carved and painted by the local artist Jo Mora (1876–1947), and displayed within a small wooden shrine, surrounded by plants and a pair of wooden benches. The opening day, coincided with the Junipero Serra Day Celebration featuring Garnet Holme's Carmel Mission play Serra, at the Forest Theater.

== See also ==
- Statue of Junípero Serra
