= Mother Cabrini Shrine =

Religious shrine in Golden, Colorado

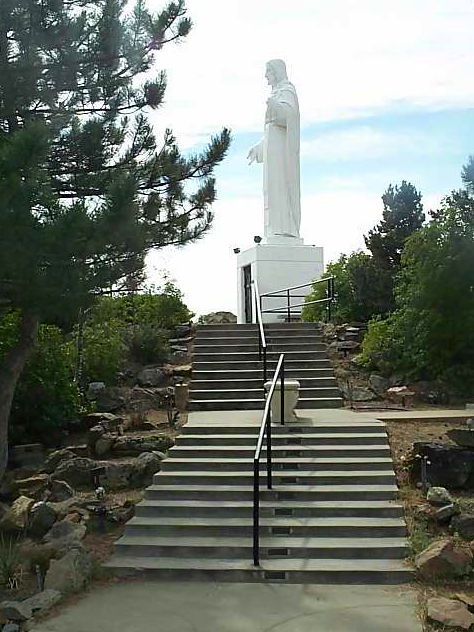
- Sacred Heart of Jesus statue at the Mother Cabrini Shrine

Religion
- Affiliation: Roman Catholic

Location
- Location: 20189 Cabrini Boulevard; Golden, Colorado 80401
- Interactive map of Mother Cabrini Shrine
- Coordinates: 39.705772°N 105.231099°W

U.S. National Register of Historic Places
- Added to NRHP: January 14, 2000
- NRHP Reference no.: 99001666

Website
- http://www.mothercabrinishrine.org/

Mother Cabrini Shrine is a shrine to Saint Frances Xavier Cabrini, known as Mother Cabrini, located in Golden, Colorado, United States.

The shrine site includes the Stone House, listed on the National Register of Historic Places as the Queen of Heaven Orphanage Summer Camp; a 22-foot (7 m) statue of the Sacred Heart of Jesus designed by Maurice Loriaux; and a convent of the Missionary Sisters of the Sacred Heart of Jesus, the order founded by Cabrini.

== History ==
Mother Frances Xavier Cabrini found the property, which had two barns and a springhouse but no reliable source of water, on the side of Lookout Mountain in 1902. She negotiated the purchase of the property in 1910 to use as a summer camp for Queen of Heaven Orphanage. A small farming operation was established and operated by Sisters of the Sacred Heart and during the summer, the camp hosted groups of girls from the orphanage to enjoy the outdoors and complete tasks on the farm.

Water was hauled up to the camp from the stream in Mount Vernon Canyon until 1912, when Cabrini discovered a spring on the property. A replica of the grotto of Lourdes was built over the spring in 1929, then replaced by the current sandstone grotto in 1959. The Stone House, designed as a dormitory for the summer camp, began construction in 1912 and was completed in 1914.

The property became a pilgrimage site in 1938 following Cabrini's beatification. The property was officially established as a shrine in 1946, the year she was canonized. In 1954, a 22-foot (7 m) statue of the Sacred Heart of Jesus, designed by Maurice Loriaux and mounted on an 11-foot (3 m) base, was erected at the highest point of the site. A 373-step stairway was placed for pilgrims to climb, following Cabrini's path up the mountain, marked with the Stations of the Cross.

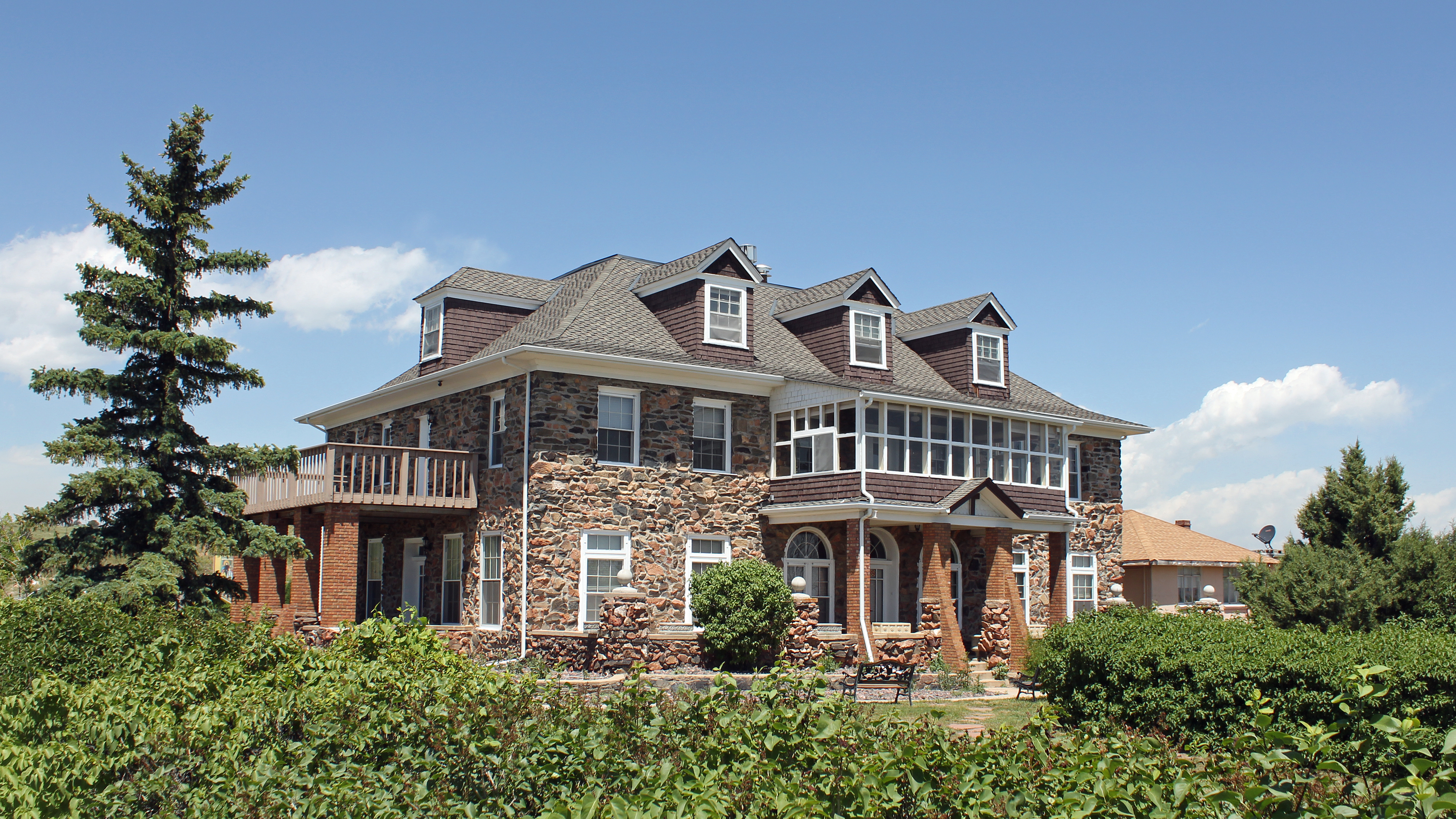
The Stone House in 2014

The summer camp closed in 1967 and the Stone House was used as a temporary convent until a permanent building was completed in 1970. Today, the convent contains a chapel, meeting rooms, gift shop, housing for the resident Sisters, and overnight accommodations for visitors. The statues and stained-glass windows of the chapel came from Villa Cabrini Academy in Burbank, California, a former school founded by the Missionary Sisters.

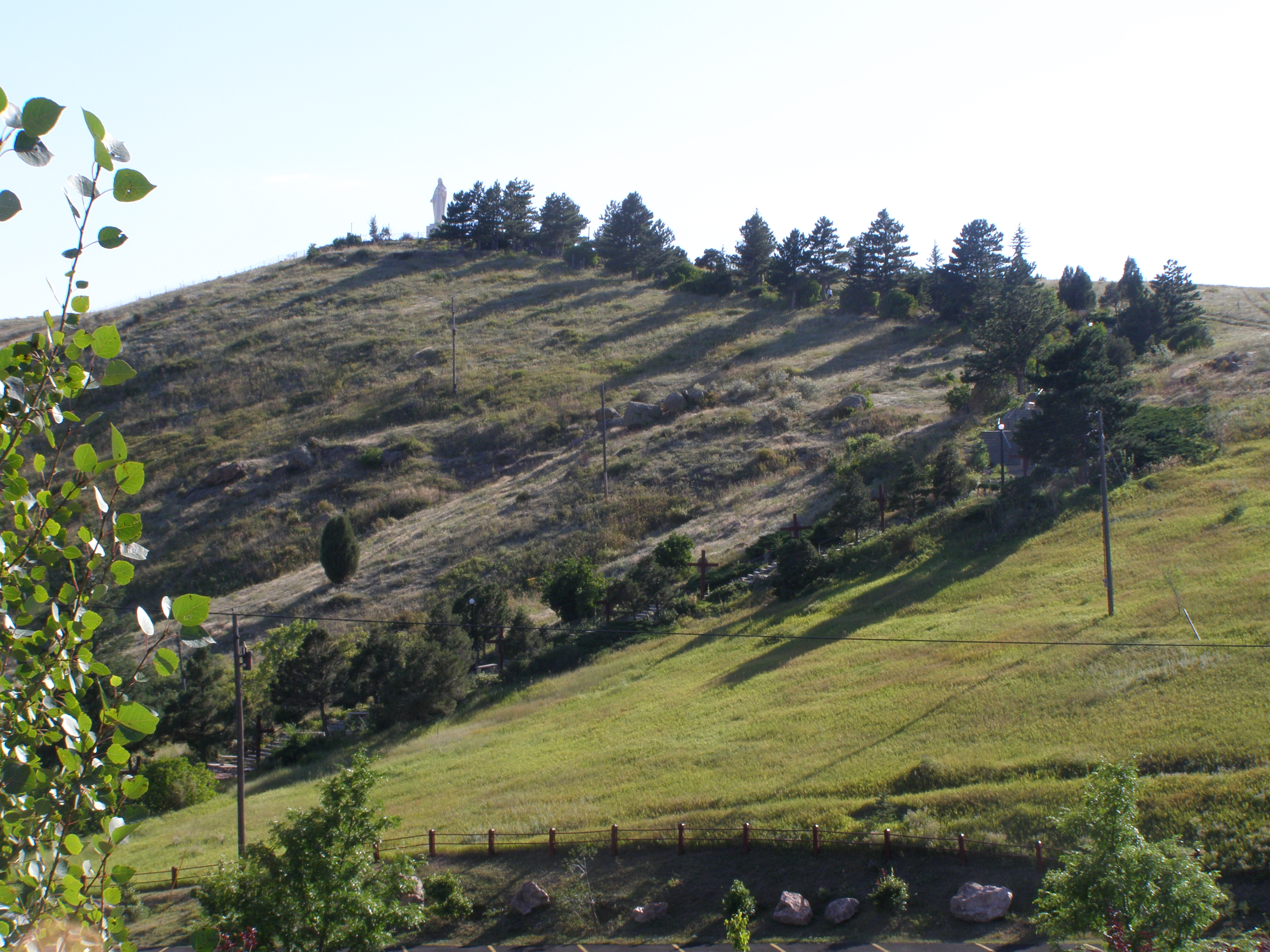
Walk to the Statue of Jesus

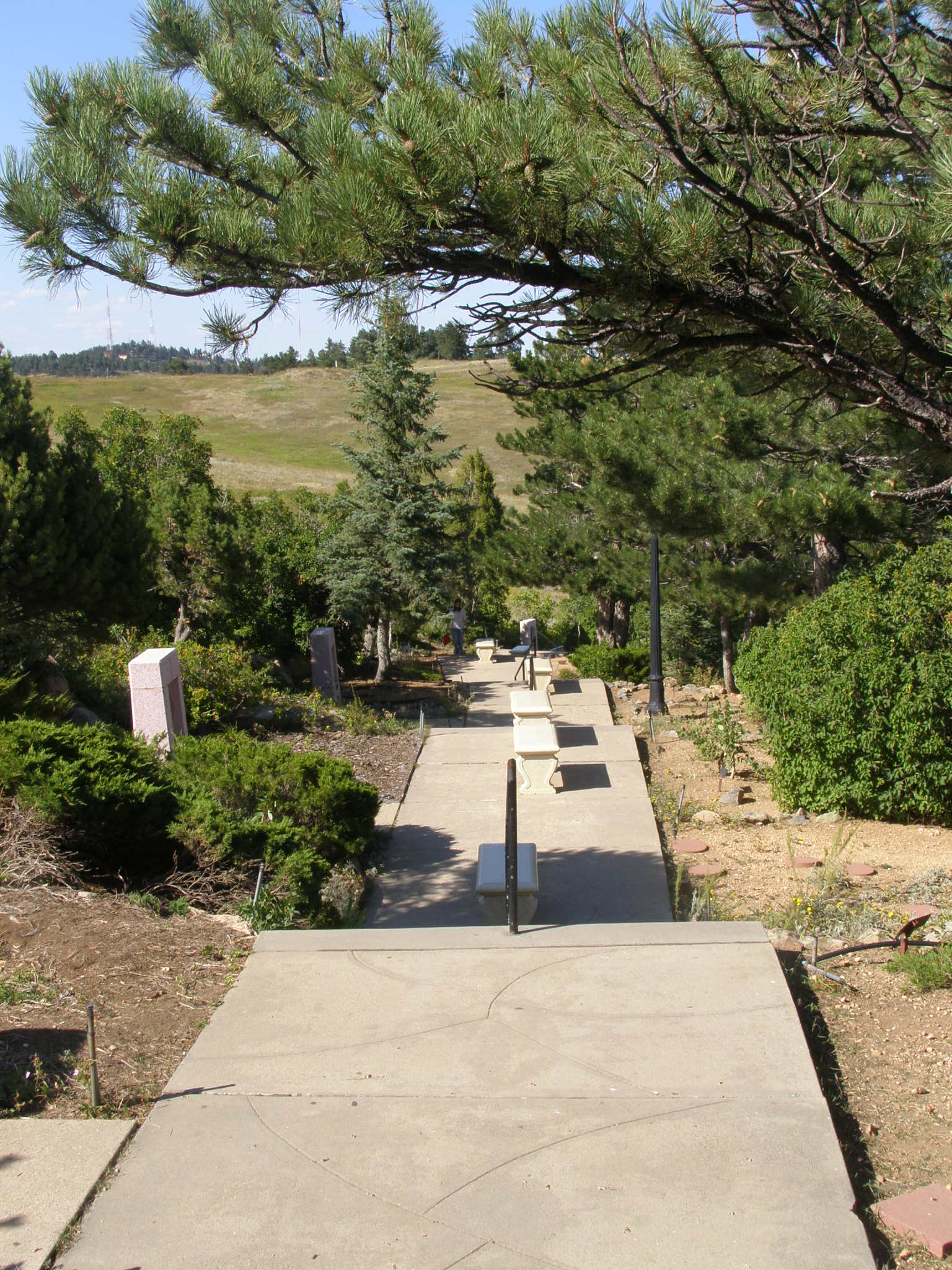
Walk to the Statue of Jesus

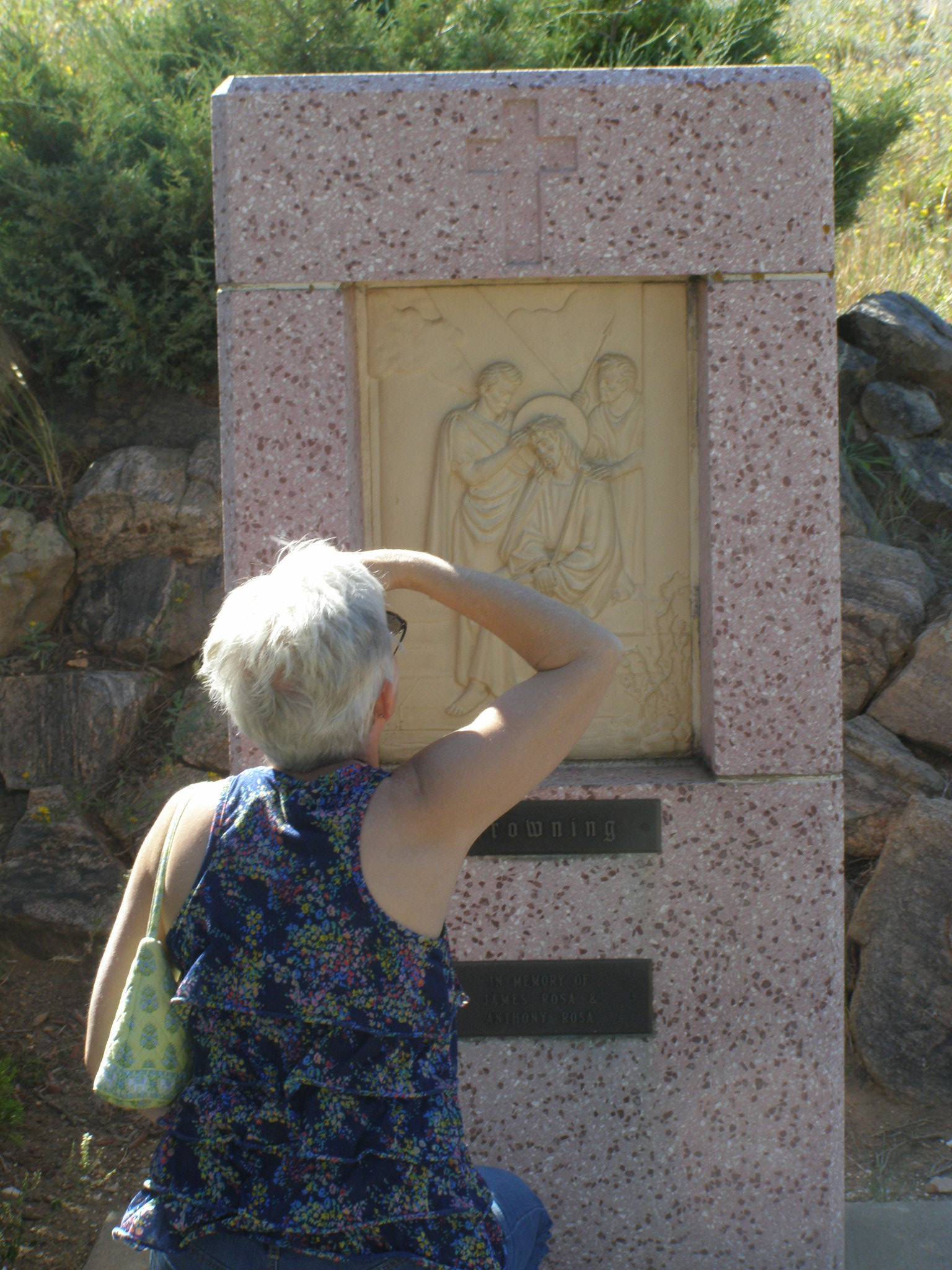
Crowning - Walk through the life of Jesus from the Gospels

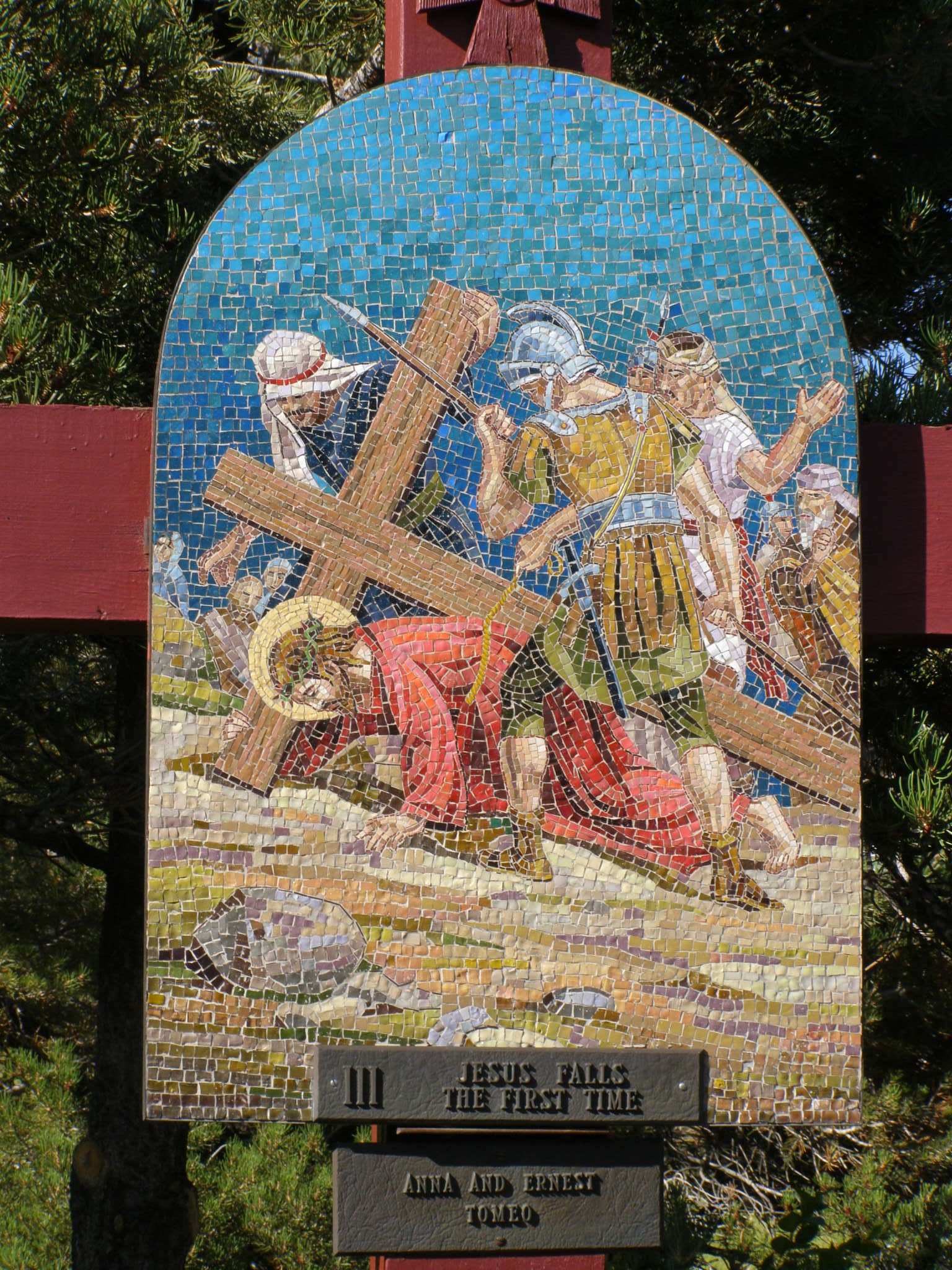
Station 3: Jesus falls the first time

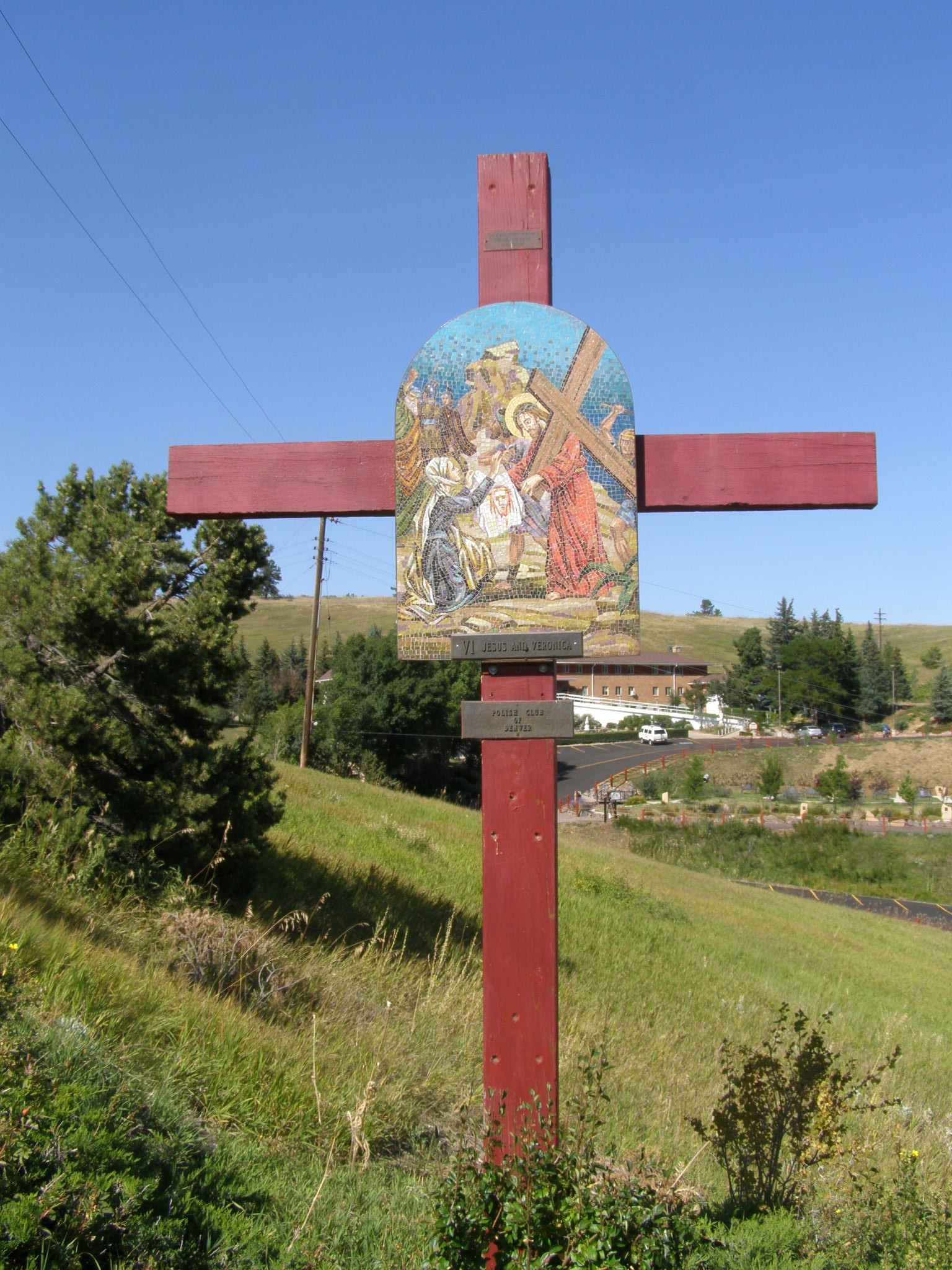
Station 6: Jesus meets Veronica.

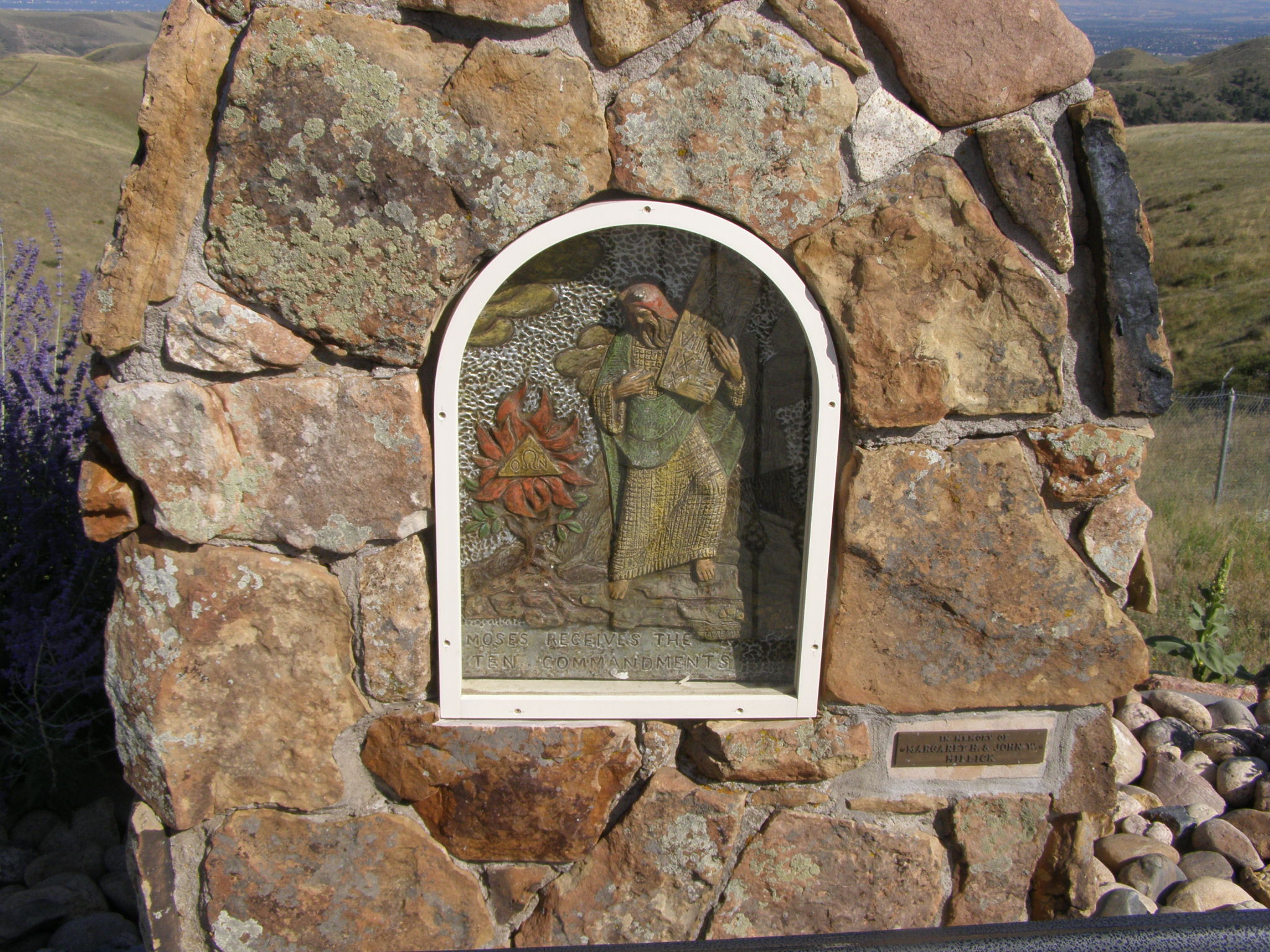
Moses receives the Ten Commandments.

== See also ==
- National Register of Historic Places listings in Jefferson County, Colorado
- National Shrine of Saint Frances Xavier Cabrini (Chicago)
- St. Frances Xavier Cabrini Shrine (New York City)
