= Maurice Loriaux =

Maurice Lucien Loriaux (August 27, 1909 – July 29, 1998) was an American artist who played an important role in the post-World War II art colony established in Santa Fe, New Mexico.

== Career ==
Loriaux founded Santa Fé Studios of Church Art, employing the talents of native New Mexican artists to fashion woodwork, brass, wrought iron, and stained glass, predominantly for Catholic churches. The Santa Fe Studios were one of the principal suppliers of ecclesiastical artwork in the United States, contributing to the interiors of more than 400 churches, including Saint Peter's in the Loop, Chicago; St. Brendan, Los Angeles; Holy Family Catholic Church, Fort Worth; St. Paul's Cathedral, St Paul; and Our Lady Queen of Angels, Birmingham. In addition, his Studios renovated Mission Santa Barbara in California. Loriaux also designed the 22-foot statue of the Sacred Heart at Mother Cabrini Shrine near Denver, and the Junípero Serra monument at the California State Capitol Museum.

== Selected works ==
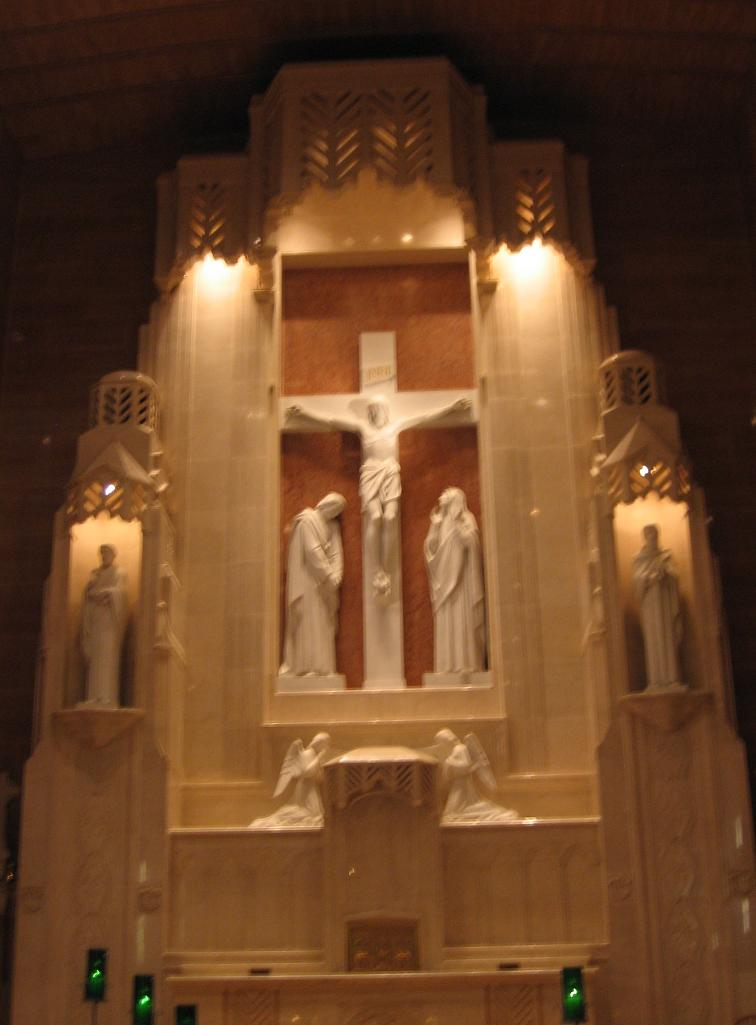
Reredos at St. Peter's Church, Chicago.

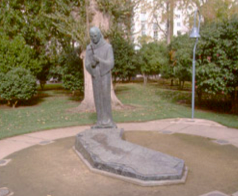
Junipero Serra Monument at the capitol grounds in Sacramento, California

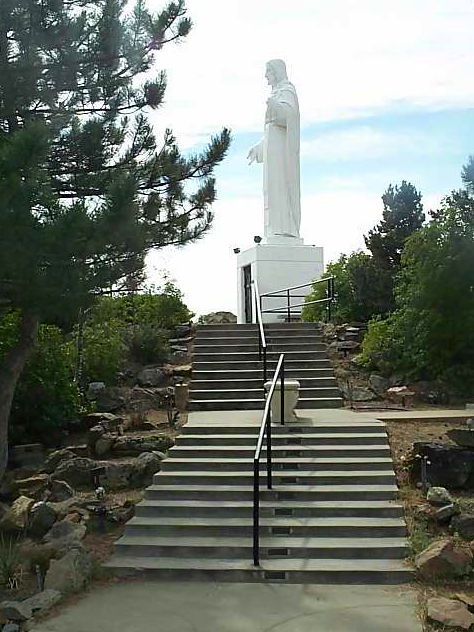
Sacred Heart statue at Mother Cabrini Shrine in Golden, Colorado
