= Statue of Junípero Serra (San Francisco) =

Statue formerly in Golden Gate Park

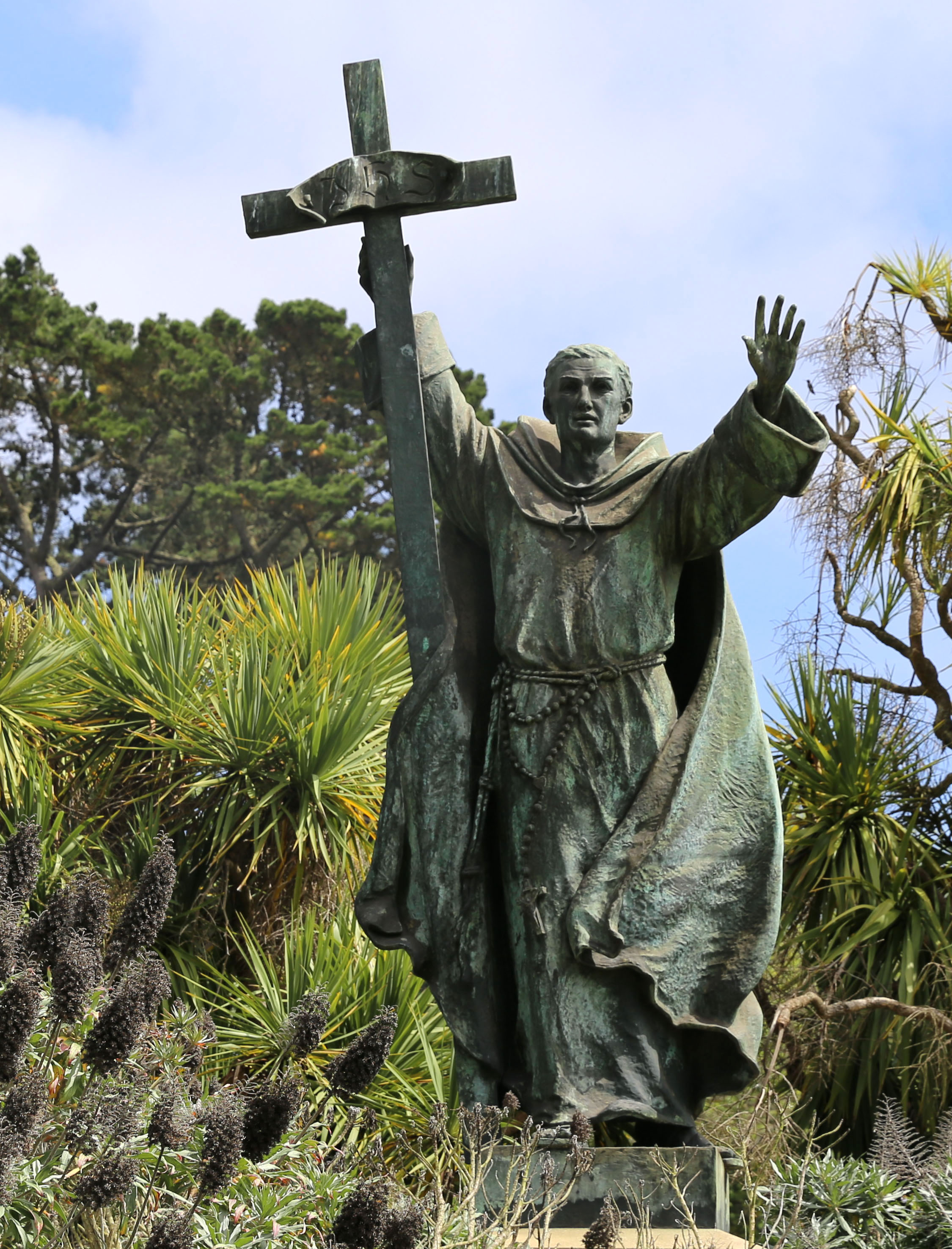
- The statue in 2015
- Subject: Junípero Serra
- Location: San Francisco, California, U.S.; 37.77183°N 122.46657°W

The 30-foot (9.1 m) tall statue of Junípero Serra sculpted by Douglas Tilden was erected in San Francisco's Golden Gate Park in 1907.

== 2020 riots ==
On June 19, 2020, the statue was toppled and defaced by a mob of vandals associated with the George Floyd protest Other nearby monuments were also toppled or otherwise vandalized include: the statue of Francis Scott Key (author of the lyrics to "The Star-Spangled Banner"), Ulysses S. Grant, German poets Goethe-Schiller monument and a group consisting of Don Quixote and his companion, Sancho Panza, kneeling to honor their creator, Cervantes.

According to police statements reported by the press, officers arriving at the scene encountered “several hundred people” actively vandalizing the monuments. When additional officers attempted to approach the mob turned violent, pelting them with various thrown objects. The assault forced officers to withdraw without making arrests, leaving the vandals free to continue destroying the statues.

=== Reactions ===
Following the attacks, city work crews removed the affected statues and placed them into storage. The local catholic community was horrified by the desecration of the Serra monument. San Francisco Archbishop Salvatore Cordileone publicly condemned the incident as "blasphemy and sacrilege". Cordileone further admonished local prosecutors for not pursuing hate crime charges against the perpetrators and stated how Christians are not receiving equal protection under the law.

== See also ==
- List of monuments and memorials removed during the George Floyd protests
- Statue of Junípero Serra (disambiguation)
