= Statue of Junípero Serra (Monterey, California) =

Statue in Monterey, California, U.S.

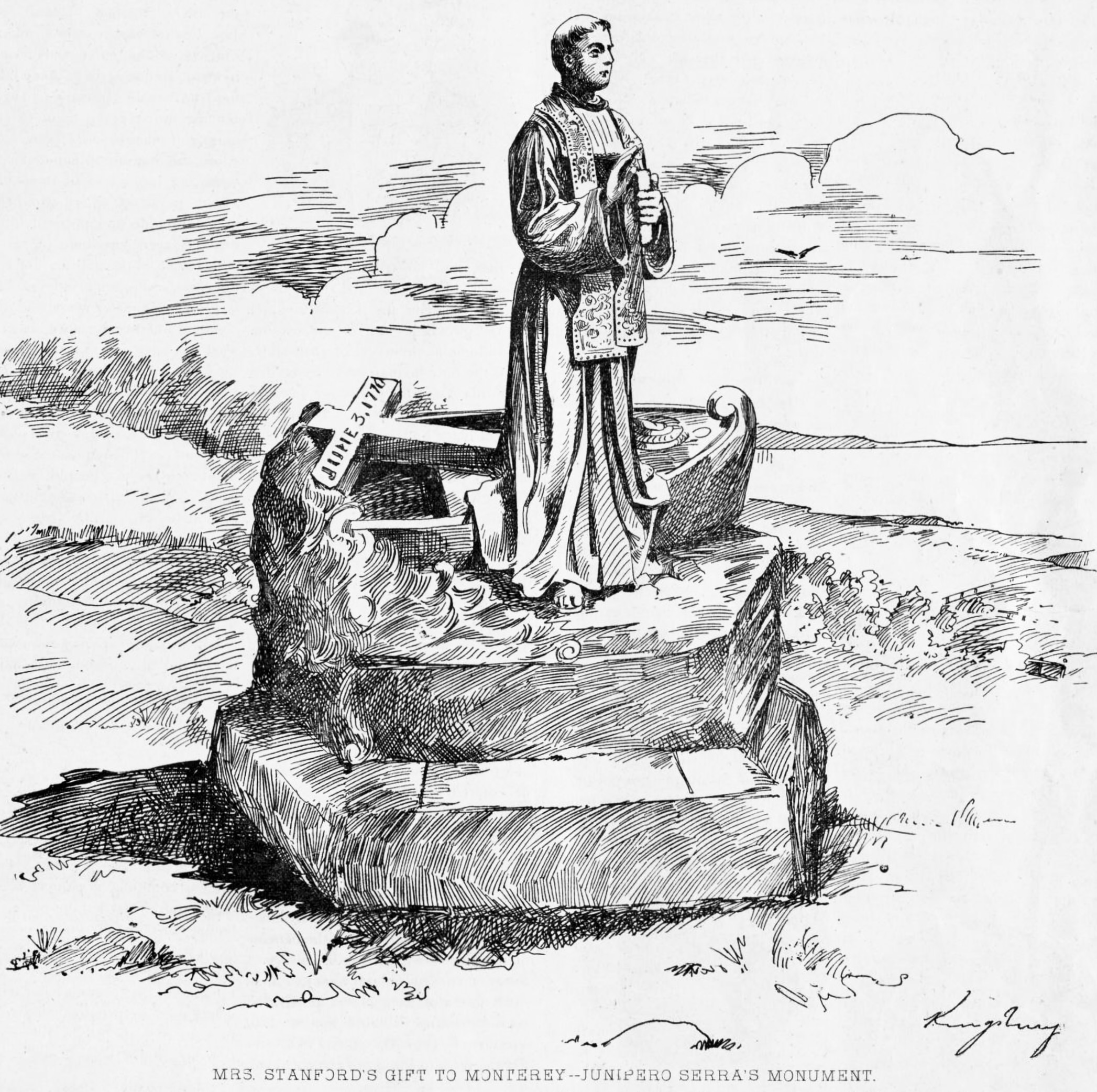
- Statue of Junípero Serra (Monterey, California)
- Subject: Junípero Serra
- Location: Monterey, California, U.S.

In 1891, Mrs. Stanford made a gift to Monterey, the Statue of Junípero Serra's monument that was installed in Lower Presidio Park, Monterey, California, United States.

The memorial was vandalized and decapitated, in 2015.
