= Felipe de Neve =

Governor of the Californias from 1775 to 1782

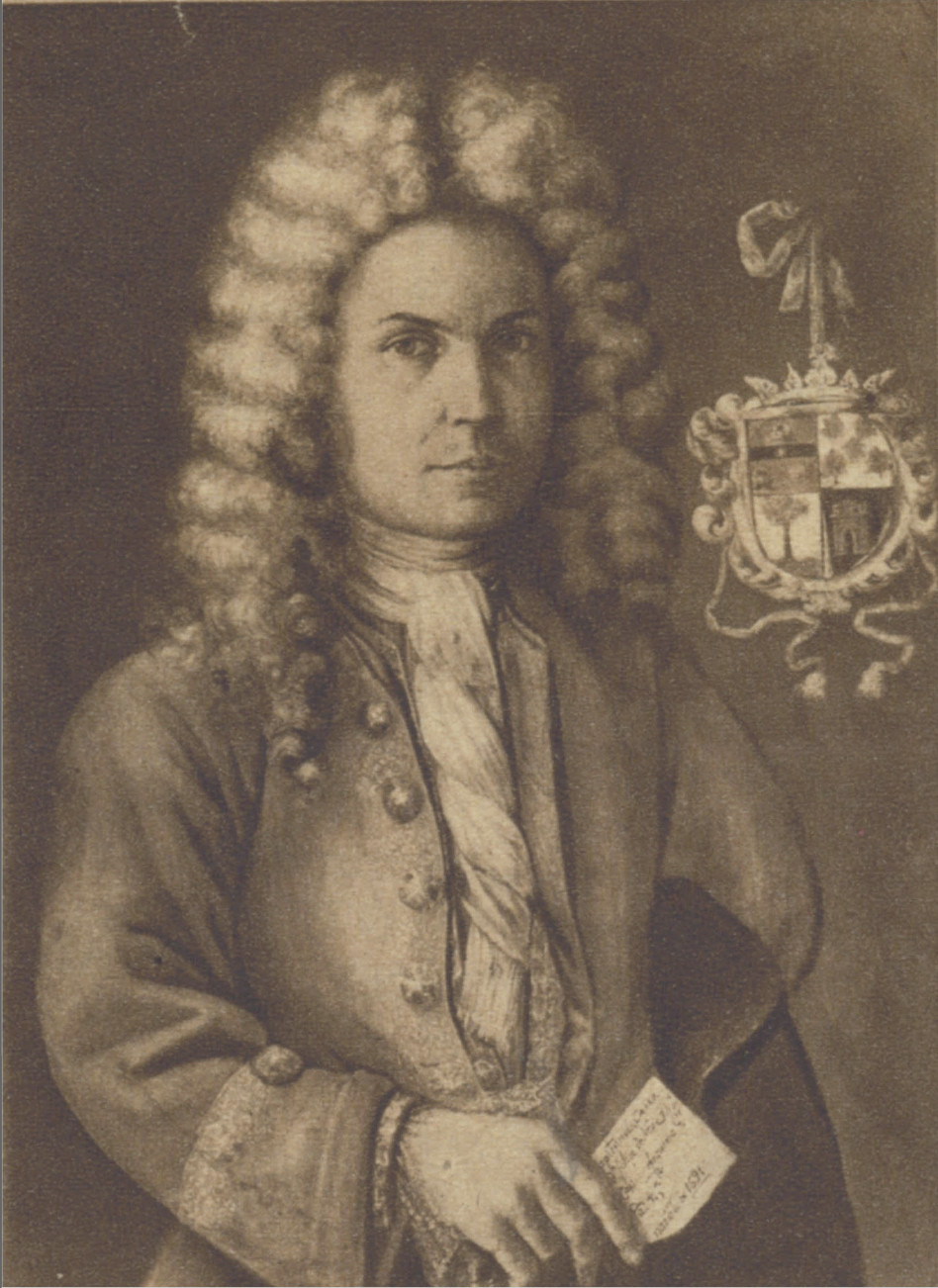

4th Governor of the Californias
- In office 1777–1782
- Monarch: Charles III
- Preceded by: Fernando Rivera y Moncada
- Succeeded by: Pedro Fages

Personal details
- Born: Felipe de Neve y Padilla; 1724 Bailén, Jaén, Spain
- Died: 3 November 1784 (aged 59–60) Chihuahua, Nueva Vizcaya, New Spain (now Mexico)
- Occupation: Explorer, politician

Military service
- Allegiance: Spain
- Years of service: 1744–1784
- Rank: Commandante General

Felipe de Neve y Padilla (1724 – 3 November 1784) was a Spanish soldier who served as the 4th Governor of the Californias, from 1775 to 1782. Neve is one of the founders of Los Angeles and was instrumental in the foundation of San Jose and Santa Barbara.

== Biography ==
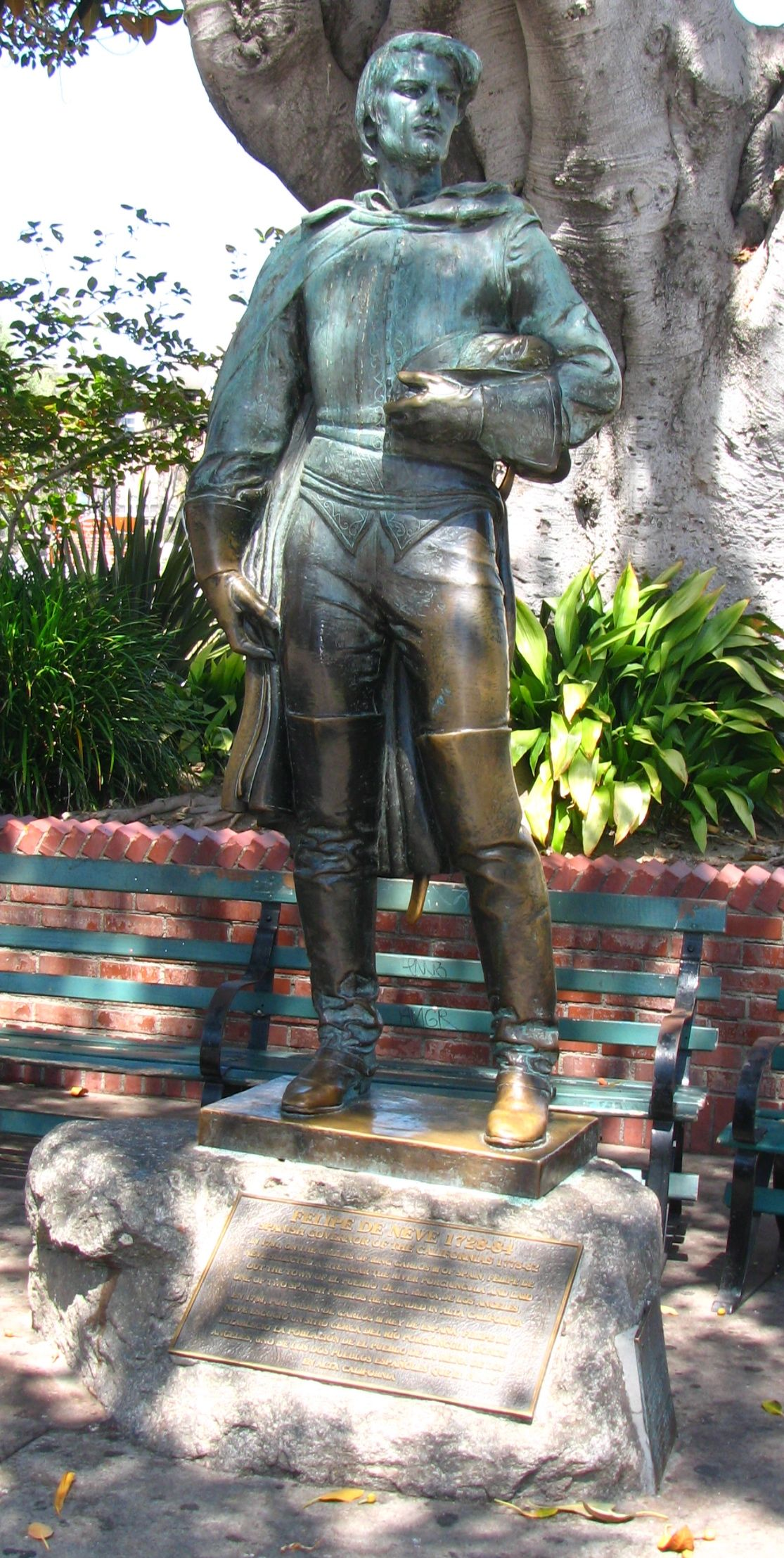
A statue of Neve in the Los Angeles Plaza.

=== Early life ===
Born in Bailén, Spain, Neve was the son of Mary D. Padilla y Costilla and Felipe de Neve Noguera Castro y Figueroa and was born into one of the well-respected families of Andalucia. Neve entered the military in 1744 at about 16 years of age. Neve served as a soldier in Cantabria, Flanders, Milan, and Portugal before arriving in New Spain. During his time as a major he administered the colleges of Zacatecas, New Spain.

Neve was appointed as acting Governor of Las Californias on October 18, 1774 by Viceroy Antonio Maria de Buareli y Ursua. For the first two years of his appointment, Neve was based in Loreto, Baja California and later moved to Monterey.

=== Las Californias ===
It was during Neve's administration that Lieutenant José Joaquín Moraga is credited with building the Presidio of San Francisco, after the site was selected by Juan Bautista de Anza in 1776. Moraga is also known as the founder of El Pueblo de San José de Guadalupe, the present day city of San Jose, California. On November 29, 1777, Moraga founded San José on orders from Antonio María de Bucareli y Ursúa, the Spanish Viceroy of New Spain. It was the first Spanish colonial pueblo in the northern region of Las Californias Province, which became its own Alta California Province in 1804. The city served as a farming community to support the Presidio of San Francisco and the Presidio of Monterey.

In 1781, later in Neve's tenure, he founded the Pueblo de Los Ángeles. Governor Neve had applied to Viceroy Bucareli for permission to establish a settlement (pueblo) near the Los Angeles River (Río de Porciúncula), where Father Juan Crespí had met local Tongva Indians. With the viceroy's approval, de Neve was granted authority from The Crown, Charles III of Spain, to found and establish the second pueblo in upper Las Californias, El Pueblo de Nuestra Señora la Reina de los Ángeles del Río de Porciúncula (The Pueblo of Our Lady Queen of the Angels of the Porciúncula River), the present day city of Los Angeles, California. Neve is credited with being one of the first urban planners because he personally drew the plans for the pueblo. Neve traveled north to inspect the Presidio and mission of San Francisco and the mission of Santa Clara and issued several reports on recent happenings in the Californias and recommendations for establishments, including the recommendation for the site of the city of Los Angeles. "The site had been scheduled for a mission since 1769 when Franciscan Father Juan Crespi first saw it and named it Nuestra Señora de Los Angeles de la Porciuncula for the river on which it was located."

In 1781, Neve issued the "Reglamento para el gobierno de la provincia de Californias (Regulations for the Government of the Province of the Californias), the first rules regarding governance of secular pueblos like Los Angeles.

==== Los Angeles ====
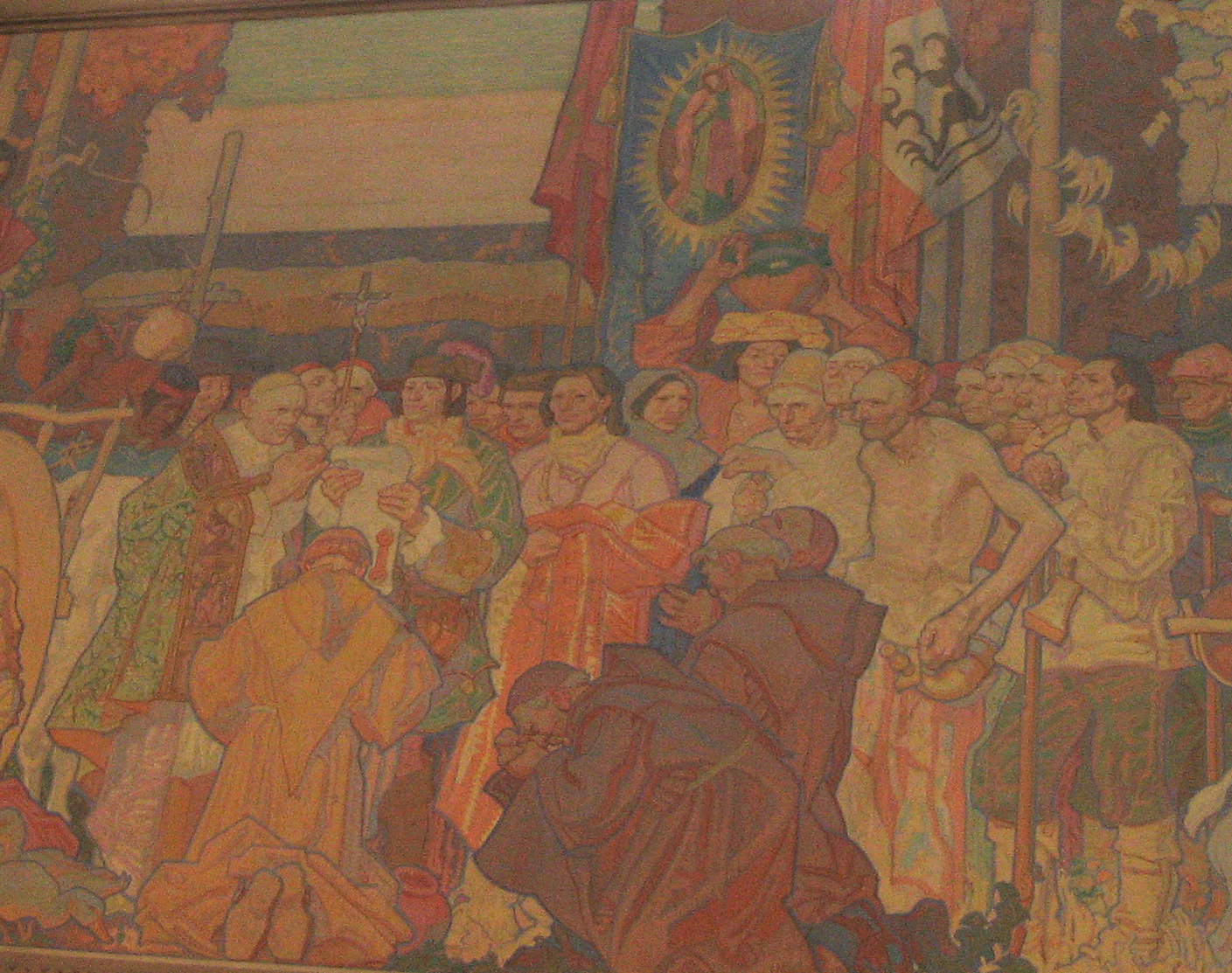
The Founding of Los Angeles mural at the Los Angeles Central Library; Dean Cornwell, 1933.

The location of the site was already inhabited by Native Americans who Father Crespi described as "very docile and friendly." The town was called Yabit and the attitude of the Natives towards the foreigners did not change over time. Neve arrived to the site in 1779 where he selected three dozen boys and girls for conversion to Christianity and acted as the godfather to twelve of the children. Neve also selected a young married couple, renamed them as Felipe de Neve and Phelipa Theresa de Neve and remarried them.

Governor de Neve had applied to Viceroy Bucareli for permission to establish a settlement (pueblo) near the Los Angeles River (Río de Porciúncula), where Father Juan Crespí had met local Tongva Indians. The area chosen is described below:

"The habitable spots which border the Camino Real from San Diego to Monterey with sufficient pro- portion of waters for developing cultivation are the river Santa Ana at 28 leagues from San Diego, has abundant water and it is not difficult to draw it out as it proves, at seven leagues is the river San Gabriel with much water and lands for large planting, and to raise water not proven very difficult. One league distant from the Mission of this name, which does not use its waters because they obtain abundant and suf- ficient water for lands from the various springs which flow at the foot of the mountains. At 3 leagues from the Mission is the river of Porsincula [sic] with much water easy of access for both banks and beautiful lands in which we can make use of all."

With the Viceroy's approval, de Neve was granted authority from The Crown, Charles III of Spain, to found and establish the second pueblo in upper Las Californias, El Pueblo de Nuestra Señora la Reina de los Ángeles del Río de Porciúncula (The Pueblo of Our Lady Queen of the Angels of the Porciúncula River), the present day city of Los Angeles, California was founded on September 4, 1781. Of the sixteen families Neve planned on moving to the newly established pueblo, only eleven families made it. Throughout the journey some stayed back or became too ill to travel.

==== Other Settlements ====
During Neve's tenure as governor, he quarreled constantly with the missionaries' leader, padre Junípero Serra, over the secularization of the Missions and the redistribution of land to the Mission Indian neophytes and soldiers. During his tenure four missions were founded: Mission San Francisco de Asís also called Mission Dolores (June 29, 1776), Mission San Juan Capistrano (November 1, 1776), Mission Santa Clara de Asís (January 12, 1777) and Mission San Buenaventura (March 31, 1782). Neve was given orders to establish a presidio at Santa Barbara and other pueblos with the goal of obtaining land and water for cultivation purposes. He also led a campaign against the Yumi Indians in Arizona and Southern California.

Jean-François de la Pérouse, on his expedition around the world in 1786, describes the ill treatment of natives by the ecclesiastical authorities, comparing the mission to a "plantation at Santo Domingo or any other West Indian island," noting the use of "irons and stocks," lashes of the whip, and the recourse to military authority to repossess any native converts who had chosen to return to their "relations in the independent villages." La Pérouse visited Monterrey under the governorship of Pedro Fages, but has the following to say about de Neve:

The predecessor of Mr. Fages, Mr. Felipe de Neve, commander of the interior provinces of Mexico, a man replete with humanity and a Christian philosopher who died about four years ago, remonstrated against the practice [of corporal punishment]. He thought that the progress of the faith would be more rapid and the prayers of the Indians more agreeable to the Supreme Being if they were not constrained. He desired a constitution less monastic, affording more civil liberty to the Indians and less despotism in the executive power of the presidios, the government of which might fall into the hands of cruel and avaricious men. He thought likewise that it might perhaps be necessary to moderate their authority by the appointment of a magistrate who might be the tribune, as it were, of the Indians, and possess sufficient authority to defend them from harassments. This upright man had borne arms in service of his country from his infancy, but he was exempt from the prejudices of his profession, and well knew that military government is subject to great improprieties when not moderated by an intermediate power. He might, however, have experienced the difficulty of maintaining the conflict of three authorities in a county so remote from the governor-general of Mexico, since the missionaries, though pious and respectable, are already at open variance with the governor, who appears to me to be a worth military character.

== Final years and honors ==
Felipe de Neve recited the Cross of the Order of San Carlos and was made a Brigadier General. Governor de Neve's success as provincial governor won him a promotion in 1783 to succeed Teodoro de Croix as Commandante General of the Provinicas Internas, a position that had authority over al the northern provinces, including Las Californias. He held the position of Comandante General of the Frontier Provinces until his death on November 3, 1784, in hacienda Nuestra Señora del Carmen de Pena Blanca, Chihuahua, New Spain.

== Legacy ==
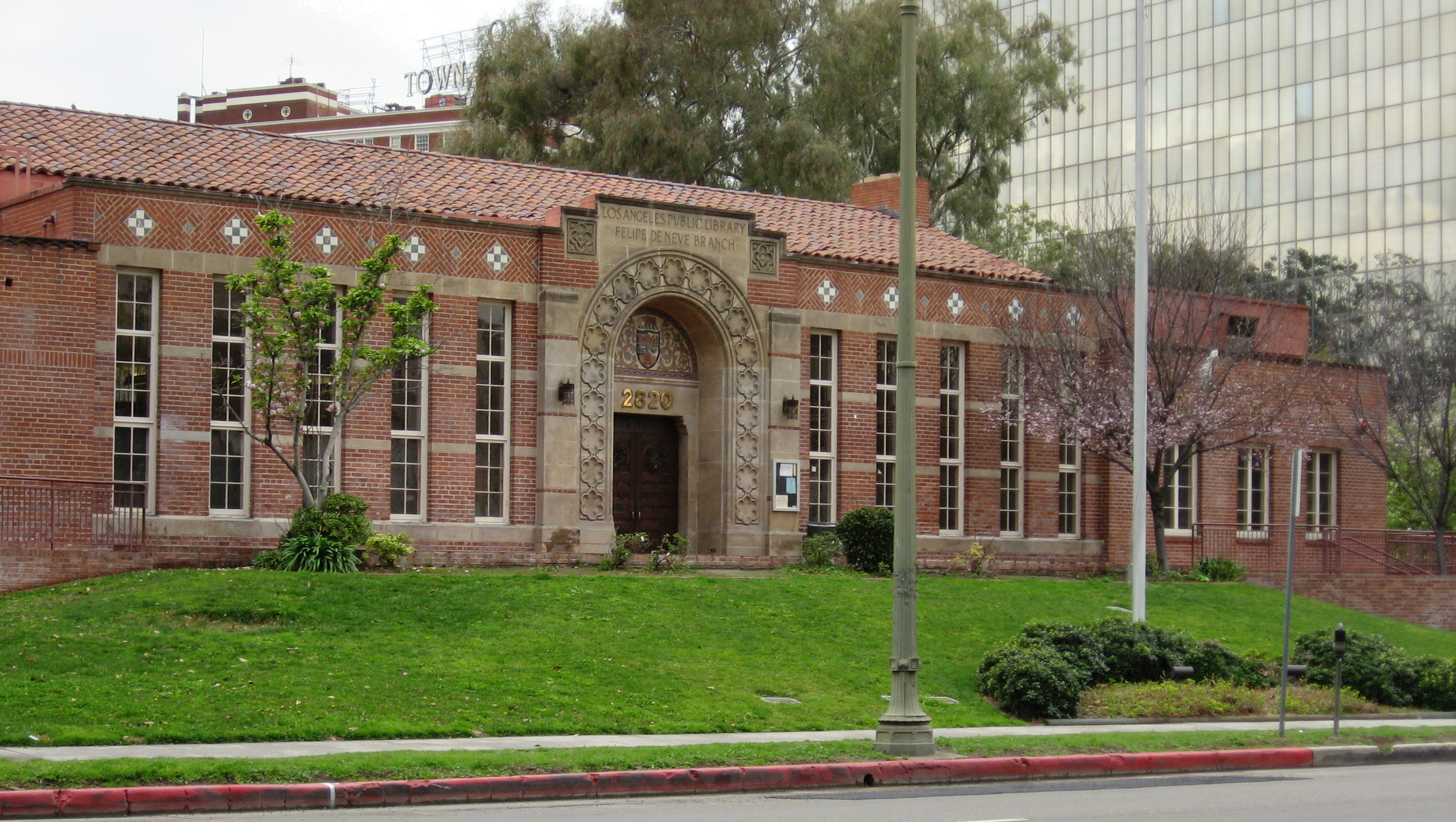
Felipe de Neve Library, Los Angeles.

A 7.5-foot cast (2.3 m) bronze statue of Felipe de Neve by Henry Lion was installed in 1932 at the Los Angeles Plaza Park in the El Pueblo District of Los Angeles, California, by the City of Los Angeles. The statue is mounted on a 4-foot boulder (1.2 m) and includes a bronze dedication plaque with the following inscription:

Felipe de Neve, 1728–84, Spanish governor of the Californias, 1775–82. In 1781 on the orders of King Carlos III of Spain, Felipe de Neve selected a site near the river Porciuncula and laid out the town of El Pueblo de la Reina de Los Angeles, one of 2 Spanish pueblos he founded in Alta California

The pueblo was proclaimed a city on May 23, 1835, by the Mexican Congress.

De Neve Drive in the Westwood neighborhood of Los Angeles is named after him, as are the student housing buildings of De Neve Plaza at the University of California, Los Angeles. The Felipe de Neve Branch Library of the Los Angeles Public Library is located in Lafayette Park in Westlake, Los Angeles is dedicated to him.

== See also ==
- History of Los Angeles

== Sources ==
- Clyde Arbuckle (1986). Clyde Arbuckle's History of San Jose. Smith McKay Printing. ISBN 978-9996625220.
- The Town of Our Lady Reina of the Angels on the Porciúncula river. (in English)

== Bibliography ==
- Edwin A. Beilharz (1971). Felipe de Neve, first Governor of California. San Francisco: California Historical Society. ISBN 9780910312097.
