= Ettore Cadorin =

American sculptor (1876–1952)

- Born: March 1, 1876; Venice
- Died: June 18, 1952 (aged 76)
- Education: Academy of Fine Arts
- Notable work: Venus tying her sandals (1913), Statue of Junípero Serra
- Spouse: Erna Mueller

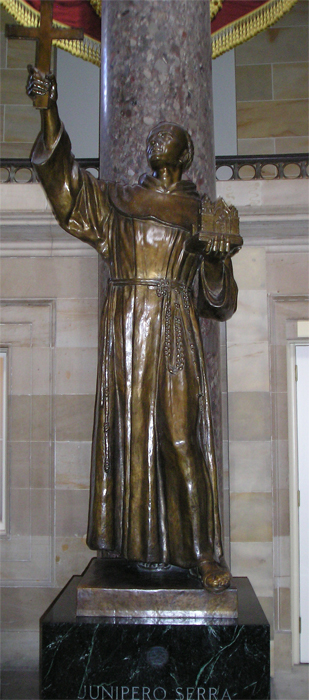
Statue of Junípero Serra, National Statuary Hall Collection

Ettore Cadorin (March 1, 1876 – June 18, 1952) was an American sculptor and teacher born in Venice. His father Vincenzo Cadorin was a woodcarver and his first teacher. He went on to study at the Academy of Fine Arts in Venice where he studied with Antonio Dal Zòtto (1841–1918), followed by further studies in Rome and Paris.

== Life ==
Arriving in the United States in 1915, Cadorin first settled in New York City, securing a position as a lecturer in Italian at Columbia University. In 1925 he relocated to California, where he remained for the rest of his life. While living in California he was selected to produce his best known work in the United States, the 1930 bronze statue of Junipero Serra located in the National Statuary Hall Collection in the Capitol Building, Washington, D.C., one of the two statues representing his adopted home state. Also located in Washington are his three "large stone statues of the patron saints" located at the National Cathedral. In the creation of these figures, Saint Peter, Saint Paul and Saint John, Cadorin was assisted by Marian Brackenridge, and they were carved by Italo Fanfani.

Cadorin created numerous funerary monuments in Europe; his work is found in cemeteries in Venice, Paris, Budapest, Bucharest and the Netherlands, as well as Woodlawn Cemetery in New York City.

He was a member of the National Sculpture Society.

He was married to an Australian contralto, Erna Mueller, who trained at the Bendigo Conservatory. The image of his statue Venus tying her sandals (1913) is now used as the logo of the Bendigo Art Gallery.
