= Statue of Junípero Serra (Sacramento, California) =

Statue formerly in Capitol Park

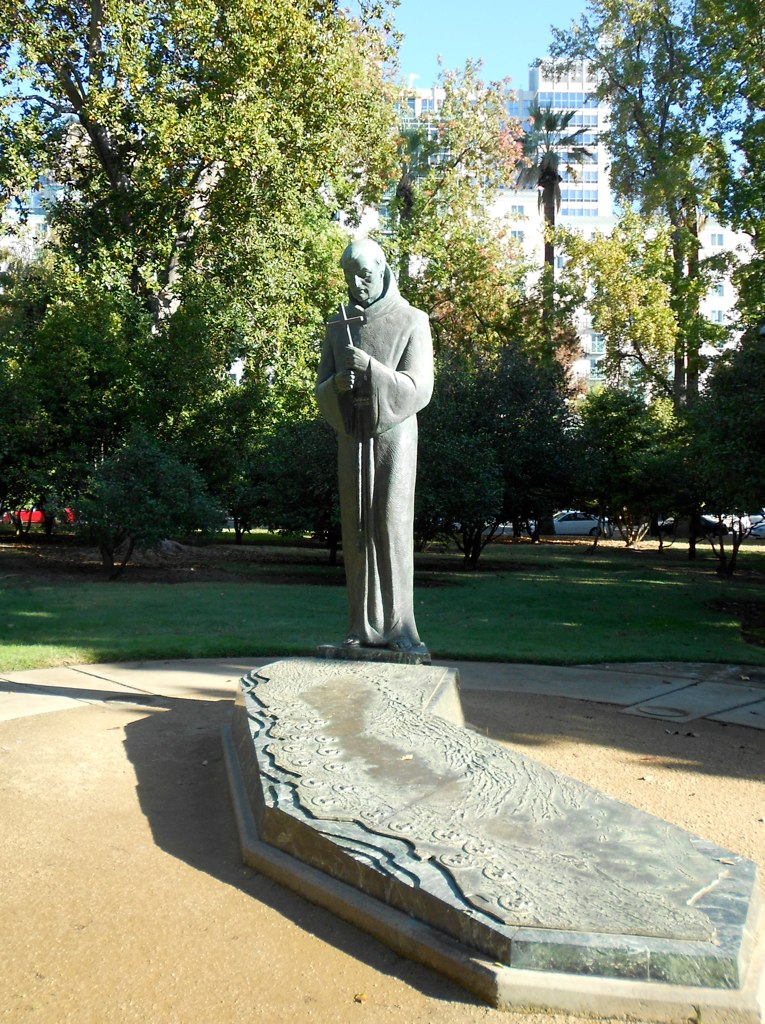
- Artist: Maurice Loriaux
- Year: 1967
- Subject: Junípero Serra
- Condition: in storage
- Location: California State Capitol Museum; Sacramento, California, U.S.; 38°34′36″N 121°29′28″W
- Owner: California State Parks

A statue of Junípero Serra in Capitol Park, near the California State Capitol, in Sacramento, California, was installed from 1967 until 2020. The statue was put in storage after demonstrators toppled it during a racial justice protest. In August 2021, legislators passed a bill to replace the statue with a monument to local Indigenous nations. The bill needs the signature of the governor to become law.

== See also ==
- List of monuments and memorials removed during the George Floyd protests
