= Statue of Felipe de Neve =

Sculpture in Los Angeles, California, U.S.

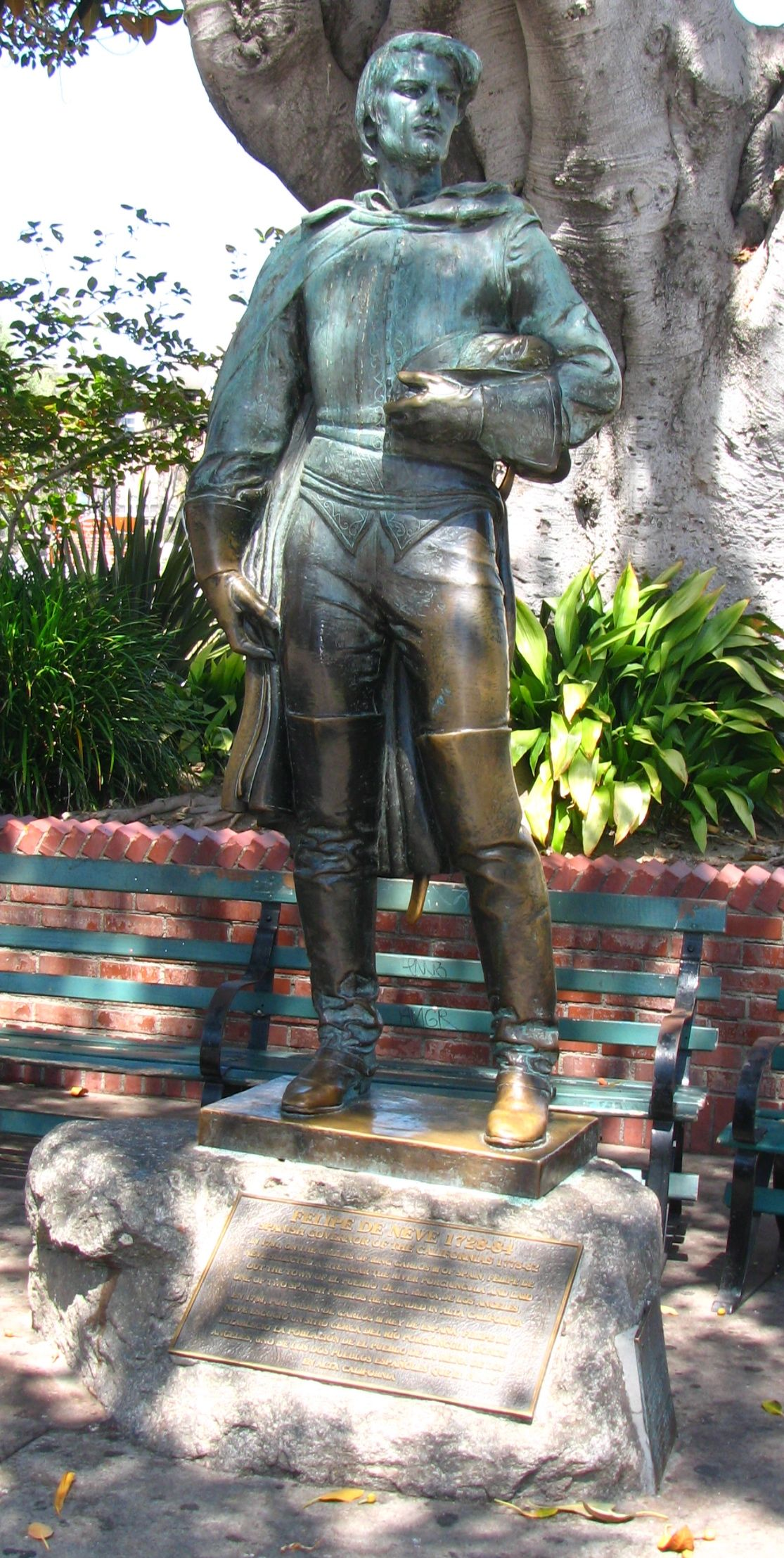
- Artist: Henry Lion
- Subject: Felipe de Neve
- Location: Los Angeles, California, U.S.; 34°3′24″N 118°14′20.4″W

A statue of Felipe de Neve (sometimes called Don Felipe de Neve or Governor Felipe de Neve) by Henry Lion is installed in Los Angeles' El Pueblo de Los Ángeles Historical Monument, in the U.S. state of California.
