= Statue of Junípero Serra (Carmel Woods, California) =

Statue in Carmel-Woods, California, U.S.

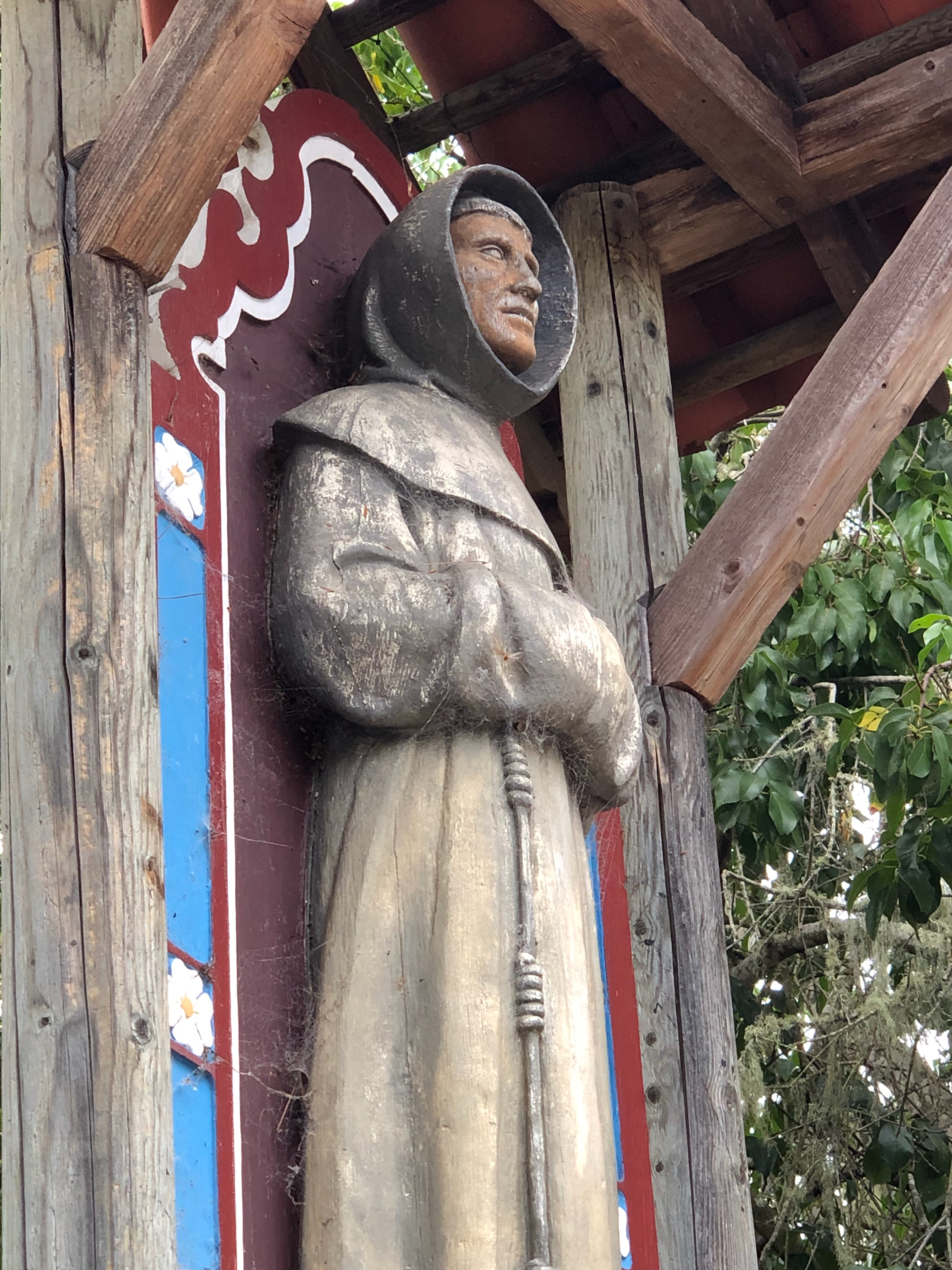
- The statue in 2018
- Artist: Joseph Jacinto Mora
- Year: 1922
- Medium: Oak sculpture
- Subject: Junípero Serra
- Location: Carmel-by-the-Sea, California, U.S.; 36.56492°N 121.91961°W

A statue of Junípero Serra, also known as the Serra Shrine, was installed in the community of Carmel Woods in Monterey County, California, United States. Artist Joseph "Jo" Mora (1876–1947), designed and carved the wood statue of Serra for real estate developer Samuel F.B. Morse's new subdivision.

== Description and history ==
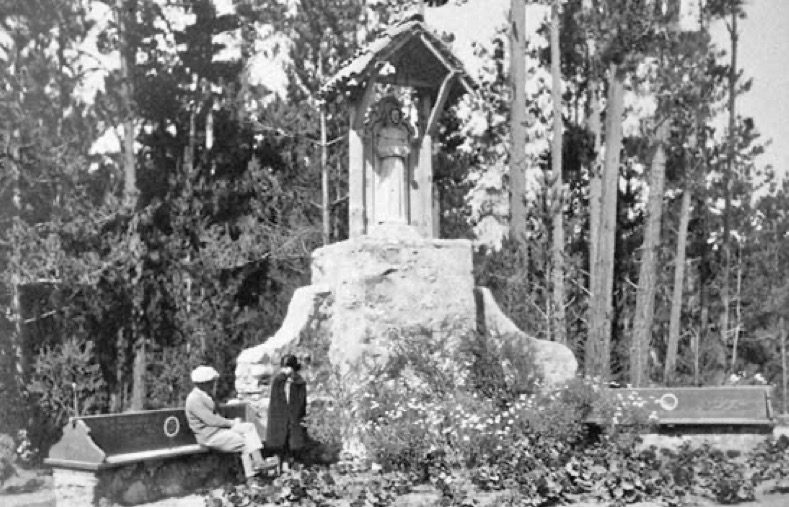
Carmel Woods with Jo Mora and his daughter Patti in 1922

A shrine with a wooden statue of Junípero Serra was installed on July 22, 1922, which was the opening day of the Carmel Woods subdivision, as well as Serra Day, an officially proclaimed holiday by the Town Trustees of Carmel. The memorial was located at the intersection of Serra Avenue, Dolores Street, Alta Avenue, and Camino Del Monte in the community of Carmel Woods in Carmel-by-the-Sea, California.

The small statue was carved from oak by the local artist Joseph Jacinto Mora, and was displayed within a wooden shrine, surrounded by plants and a pair of wooden benches. The sculpture was commissioned by Samuel F. B. Morse, president of Del Monte Properties Company, for the entrance to the new Carmel Woods development. At the opening day, the Serra Shrine was dedicated in the Serra Circle of Carmel Woods by Father Raymond Mestres, pastor of the Carmel Mission. A poem written by George Sterling to indicate the building of the statue was read during the ceremony. A replica of the statue was carried in a pageant procession from Carmel Mission to Carmel Woods with a cavalry guard and a band from the Monterey Presidio.

The statue was vandalized using black paint on September 23, 2015. Following fears that the shrine would be vandalized again during the George Floyd protests, it was removed for safekeeping by the Carmel city administration on June 23, 2020.

== See also ==
- List of monuments and memorials removed during the George Floyd protests
