= Primero sueño =

1692 poem by Juana Inés de la Cruz

The First Dream
- by Juana Inés de la Cruz
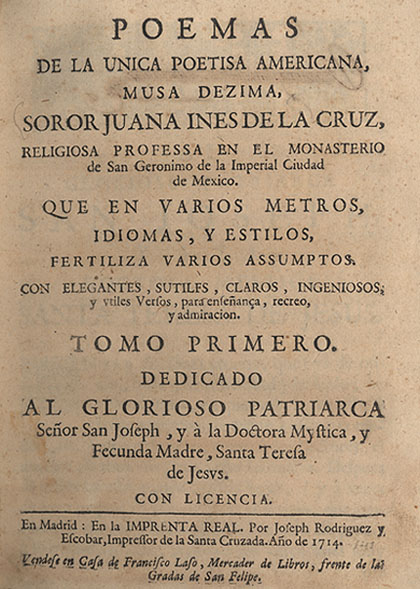
- One of Sor Juana's first volumes of poetry, which included Primero sueño
- Original title: Primero sueño
- Language: Spanish
- Form: Silva
- Publication date: 1692

Primero sueño (English: The First Dream) is a poem in Spanish written by Juana Inés de la Cruz (often referred to as "Sor Juana") and it is the only work that she wrote for her own enjoyment. Primero sueño was published in 1692 as a part of the second volume of the nun's works with the cover page proclaiming: "Second volume of the works of Sor Juana Inés de la Cruz, professed nun in the Monastery of Saint Jerome in the imperial city of Mexico" (Sevilla, Tomás López de Haro, 1692).

The poem appeared in print with the title Primero sueño, as the title was not Sor Juana's work, the poem's critics have expressed doubt about whether the title was appropriate for the work, but the author herself could have expressed her disagreement, which she never did. In her letter La Respuesta a Sor Filotea de la Cruz, Sor Juana only references the poem as Sueño (English: A Dream). Regardless, and as the poet herself affirms, the title of the poem is an homage to Luis de Góngora and his Soledades.

== About the poem ==
Primero sueño is the longest of Sor Juana's poems at 976 verses. It is in the silva style and uses assonant rhythm with a simple theme, although presented in a highly complex manner. The poem addresses, among other important subjects (like human transcendence, knowledge, and the meaning of the universe), a recurring theme: the intellectual potential of human beings. To transform said theme into poetry, she employs a rhetorical device: in the guise of the dream itself, the soul abandons the body, which grants a poetic structure sometimes referred to as oneiric.

Primero sueño draws inspiration from various literary sources:

- Cicero's Somnium Scipionis
- Seneca's Hercules
- Francisco de Trillo y Figueroa's poetry
- Bonaventure's Pintura de la noche desde un crepúsculo a otro, el Itinerario hacia Dios, and other works
- Various works by Athanasius Kircher
- Via the works of Marsilio Ficino, several neoplatonic authors in translation like Synesius, Porphyry of Tyre, and Plotinus
- The works of the Renaissance neoplatonics: Ficino, Nicholas of Cusa, Giovanni Pico della Mirandola
- Various Christian authors including Augustine of Hippo, Thomas Aquinas, Gregory of Nyssa, and Lactantius

The complexity of the poem itself comes in part from the intertextuality with authors of archetypal and mythic literature, like the Italians Pierio Valeriano, Natalis Comes, and Vincenzo Cartari—as well as the Spaniard Baltazar de Victoria—who provide Primero sueño with an important symbolic and iconographic framework, without which, any interpretation of its meaning would be lacking.

The poem begins with the twilight of human beings and the dreams of nature and humanity. Later, the poem describes physiological functions and the failure of the soul to attempt a universal intuition. Before this failure, the soul turns to deductive reasoning and alludes excessively to the knowledge that humanity possess. The longing for knowledge is maintained, although humanity's scarce capacity to comprehend creation is acknowledged. The last part of the poem relates the awakening of the senses and the triumph of day over night.

== Analysis ==
Primero sueño is the work that best reflects Sor Juana's personality with her passion for the sciences and humanities, an unorthodox trait that could hint at the coming Enlightenment. The end of the poem, in which the Sun defeats the night, could be interpreted as the triumph of reason in the face of intolerance and prejudice. However, in light of a deeper and more thorough reading, the specter of this interpretation is amplified and considerably enriched, exceeding the heurmenutic plane of being merely functional or moral to enter the anagogic plane, typical in dreams of anabasis, like Sor Juana's poem.

The poem contains a wide variety of symbols. Shadow, in addition to representing the course of the dream, does not represent evil, as one might immediately assume, but rather responds to the important tradition of the Orphean night present in the works of spiritual christian authors: it is the night that inspires the conscious approach of the divine as a complete explanation of the universe itself. Throughout the poem, the abundant mythological allusions are woven into a web of feelings deftly calculated by the author. Additionally, there are autobiographical details in the poem, given that verses 704–780 take on "intellectual austerity", a recurring theme in Sor Juana's works.

Octavio Paz offers an unequivocal opinion about Primero sueño: "One must emphasize the absolute originality of Sor Juana, regarding what reaches the subject at the heart of her poem: There is not, in all of Spanish literature and poetry of the 16th and 17th centuries, anything like Primero sueño."

The poem is the most celebrated of Sor Juana's philosophical compositions in which one observes the use of well-known topics like Carpe diem or allusions to Catullus' poems. It is not improbable that the nun, in her zeal to emulate Góngora, might have wanted to compose a second "sueño", which would necessitate this poem be known as the "first dream", or Primero sueño. It is not known why Sor Juana never undertook this project, although the majority of scholars assume that she had originally planned to do so.

Her imitation of Góngora's style is evident in the language throughout the entire poem; although, while Góngora expresses meaning through eminently aesthetic and descriptive text, Sor Juana does this in the form of an abstract discourse. Contrary to what one might expect, the poem does not have anything in common with the poems of the same title by Francisco de Quevedo or Pedro Calderón de la Barca; it is absolutely original in both its subject and development, although it draws upon a thousand years' worth of literary inspiration.

There is a scholarly consensus among those who study Sor Juana that the poem is divided into three parts: "Slumber", "Journey", and "Awakening" (in Spanish, el dormir, el viaje, and el despertar, respectively). This, according to Pascual Buxó, is due to Sor Juana's interest in perpetuating medieval tradition—continued among Renaissance authors—of the tripartite division of the universe, which also corresponds to the parts of the human body.

One of the best-known interpretations of Primero sueño comes from Octavio Paz who maintains that:

Primero sueño is not a poem about knowledge like a vain dream, but rather the poem is about the act of knowing. This act adopts the form of a dream, not in the common sense of the word dream, nor in that of the impractical illusion, but in the spiritual journey ... The journey—a lucid dream—does not end in a revelation as dreams do in the Hermetic and Neoplatonic tradition, in truth the poem does not end: the soul hesitates, seeing itself in Phaethon and, in this, the body awakens. An epic of the act of knowing, the poem is also a confession of the doubts and the battles of Understanding. It is a confession that ends in an act of faith: not in knowledge but rather in the zeal for knowing.

— Octavio Paz. Sor Juana Inés de la Cruz, or the Traps of Fate, 1982

== Bibliography ==
- Alatorre, Antonio (2007). Sor Juana a través de los siglos (1668–1910): 1853–1910 [Sor Juana through the Centuries] (in Spanish). El Colegio de México. ISBN 978-970-32-4553-6.
- Beaupied, Aída (1996). "El silencio hermético en Primero sueño de sor Juana a la luz de la figura e ideas de Giordano Bruno" [The hermetic silence in The First Dream by Sor Juana in light of the Giordano Bruno and his ideas]. American Association of Teachers of Spanish and Portuguese (in Spanish). 79 (4): 752–761. doi:10.2307/345322. JSTOR 345322 – via JSTOR.
- Bravo Arriaga, María Dolores (1997). La excepción y la regla: estudios sobre espiritualidad y cultura en la Nueva España [The Exception and the Rule: Notes on Spirituality and Culture in New Spain] (in Spanish). Universidad Nacional Autónoma de México.
- Chávez, Ezequiel A. (1931). Ensayo de psicologia de Sor Juana Inés de la Cruz : y de estimación del sentido de su obra y de su vida para la historia de la cultura y de la formación de México [Essay on the psychology of Sor Juana Inés de la Cruz: And an estimation of the meaning of her work and her life on the history of the culture and development of Mexico] (in Spanish). Barcelona.
- de la Cruz, Juana Inés (2010). "Introducción" [Introduction]. In García Valdés, Celsa Carmen (ed.). Los empeños de una casa ; Amor es más laberinto [House of Desires/Love is the Greater Labyrinth] (in Spanish). Madrid: Cátedra. ISBN 978-84-376-2647-5.
- de la Cruz, Juana Inés (1992). González Boixo, José Carlos (ed.). Poesía lírica [Lyric Poetry] (in Spanish). Madrid: Cátedra.
- de la Cruz, Juana Inés (1955). Méndez Plancarte, Alfonso (ed.). Obras completas, III: autos y loas [Complete Works, III: Religious plays and Loas] (in Spanish). Cuidad de México: Fondo de Cultura Económica (Biblioteca Americana).
- Garza Cuarón, Beatriz; Baudot, Georges, eds. (1996). Historia de la literatura mexicana. 1. Las literaturas amerindias de México y la literatura en español en el siglo XVI [History of Mexican Literature vol. 1: Amerindian literature of Mexico and Literature in Spanish in the 16th Century] (in Spanish). Mexico City. ISBN 9789682320477.
- Olivares Zorrilla, Rocío (2008). "Refracción e imagen emblemática en el Primero sueño, de Sor Juana" [Refraction and Emblematic Image in The First Dream, by Sor Juana]. Studi Latinoamericani. Estudios Latinoamericanos (in Spanish). 2008 (4): 251–282.
- Olivares Zorrilla, Rocío (2014). "Sor Juana y Nicolás de Cusa" [Sister Juana and Nicholas of Cusa]. Hipogrifo: Revista de literatura y cultura del siglo de oro (in Spanish). 2 (2): 107–125. doi:10.13035/H.2014.02.02.08.
- Olivares Zorrilla, Rocío (2018). "De la tristitia salutifera a la elocuencia circunspecta: texturas de la simbólica espiritual en el Primero sueño, de sor Juana" [On the healthful sadness to the circumspect eloquence: The texture of spiritual symbolism in The First Dream by Sor Juana]. In Ramírez Vidal, Gerardo; Lindig Cisneros, Erika (eds.). La seducción del texto. Nuevos ensayos sobre retórica y literatura [The Seduction of the Text. New Essays on Rhetoric and Literature] (in Spanish).
- Pascual Buxó, José (2006). Sor Juana Inés de la Cruz: lectura barroca de la poesía [Sor Juana Inés de la Cruz: A Baroque reading of poetry] (in Spanish). Renacimiento. ISBN 978-84-8472-255-7.
- Paz, Octavio (1982). Sor Juana Inés de la Cruz: o las trampas de la fe [Sor Juana Inés de la Cruz, or the Traps of Faith] (in Spanish). Mexico: Fondo de Cultura Economica. ISBN 978-950-557-113-0.
- Perelmuter, Rosa (2005). "Los límites de la femineidad en Sor Juana Inés de la Cruz" [The Limits of Femininity en Sor Juana Inés de la Cruz]. Revista chilena de literatura (in Spanish). Abril 2005 (66): 157–159.
- Pérez-Amador Adam, Alberto (2004). El precipicio de Faetón: edición y comento de "Primer Sueño" de Sor Juana Inés de la Cruz [Phaethon's Ruin] (in Spanish). Universidad Autónoma Metropolitana.
- Pérez Amador Adam, Alberto (2007). La ascendente estrella: bibliografía de los estudios dedicados a Sor Juana Inés de la Cruz en el siglo XX [The Ascendant Star: A Bibliography of Research Dedicated to Sor Juana Inés de la Cruz in the 20th Century] (in Spanish). Madrid: Iberoamericana.
- Poot Herrera, Sara; Urrutia, Elena (1993). Y diversa de mí misma entre vuestras plumas ando: homenaje internacional a Sor Juana Inés de la Cruz [And separate from myself, I walk among your quills: International homage to Sor Juana Inés de la Cruz] (in Spanish). El Colegio de Mexico. JSTOR j.ctvhn08rt.
- Rodríguez Garrido, José Antonio (2004). La Carta atenagórica de sor Juana: Textos inéditos de una polémica [Sor Juana's Letter Worthy of Athena: Unedited texts from a Controversy] (in Spanish). UNAM. ISBN 970-32-1415-0.
- Sabàt de Rivers, Georgina (1976). El "Sueño" de sor Juana Inés de la Cruz: tradiciones literarias y originalidad [The "Dream" of sor Juana Inés de la Cruz: Literary Traditions and Originality] (in Spanish). Tamesis. ISBN 9780729300308.
- Salazar Mallén, Rubén (1952). Apuntes para una biografía de Sor Juana Inés de la Cruz [Notes for a Biography of Sor Juana Inés de la Cruz] (in Spanish). Editorial Stylo.
- Soriano Vallés, Alejandro (2001). "Aquella Fénix más rara" [The rarest phoenix]. Nueva Revista de Filogía Hispánica (in Spanish). 49 (2). doi:10.24201/nrfh.v49i2.2554.
- Xirau, Ramón (1997). Genio y figura de sor Juana Inés de la Cruz [Genius and the Figure of sor Juana Inés de la Cruz] (in Spanish). UNAM. ISBN 978-970-640-046-8.
