= Yugar =

Yugar is a surname. Notable people with the surname include:

- Theresa A. Yugar, Latina theologian
- Zulma Yugar (born 1952), Bolivian politician and singer

== See also ==
- Yugar, Queensland
