= Schmidhuber =

Schmidhuber is a German surname. Notable people with the surname include:

- Aron Schmidhuber (born 1947), German football referee
- August Schmidhuber (1901–1947), German Nazi SS officer executed for war crimes
- Gerhard Schmidhuber (1894–1945), German general
- Guillermo Schmidhuber (born 1943), Mexican playwright and novelist
- Jürgen Schmidhuber (born 1963), German computer scientist
- Peter Schmidhuber (1931–2020), German politician
