= Guillermo Schmidhuber =

Mexican author, playwright, and critic (born 1943)

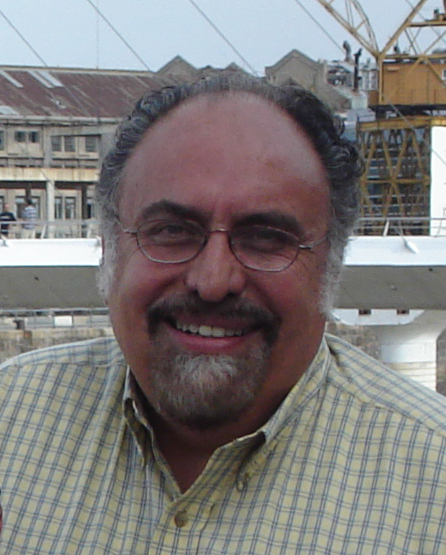
Guillermo Schmidhuber

Guillermo Schmidhuber de la Mora (born 1943, Mexico city) is a Mexican author, playwright, and critic.

== Career ==
Among his most notable works are: Obituary, The Useless Heroes, The Heirs of Segismund, The Secret Friendship of Juana and Dorothy, and Never Say Adiós to Columbus. His novel Women of the Tequila Volcano was published simultaneously in Argentina and Mexico. He has published several books on Mexican theatre, especially on the works of Rodolfo Usigli and Elena Garro. As a playwright he has won several prizes, including the Letras de Oro for best work in Spanish written in the United States (University of Miami 1987), and the National Award of Theatre by the Mexican government (INBA 1980). His plays have been translated into German, French and English.

He was professor at the University of Louisville and the University of Kentucky from 1986 to 1993. He is currently a professor at the University of Guadalajara, the second largest university in Mexico. He helped discover two previously lost texts of Sor Juana Inés de la Cruz; one of them, The Second Celestina, was published with a prologue by Octavio Paz.

From 1995 to 2001 he served as the Cultural Attaché for the Mexican state of Jalisco

== Selected work ==
Schmidhuber's bibliography covers 120 books or chapters. Some of his writings are:

- Familias paterna y materna de sor Juana Inés de la Cruz: Hallazgos Documentales, CARSO Center for the Study of Mexican History, Carlos Slim Foundation, 2016; OCLC 1010340316
- Elena Garro: un Oximorón Transfigurado en Mujer, co-authored with Olga Martha Peña Doria, Editorial Dunken (es), 2015; OCLC 946580292; ISBN 978-987-02-8405-5
- América latina y Europa: Espacios Compartidos en el Teatro Contemporáneo, "Crónica de un Alejamiento: el Teatro Español y el Mexicano 1939–2000," Madrid: Visor Libros, 2015; ISBN 978-84-9895-164-6
- Finjamos Que Soy Feliz (novel), Toluca: Editorial del Estado de México, 2014; ISBN 978-607-495-317-6
- Entre vuestras plumas ando ... : Textos Sobre Guillermo Schmidhuber, Nuevo León: Universidad Autónoma de Nuevo León, 2013. ISBN 978-607-27-0191-5
- Amigos de Sor Juana: Sexteto Biográfico:

"Juan de Guevara, colaborador"
"Antonio Núñez de Miranda, confesor. Testamento místico," by Antonio Núñez de Miranda
"Protesta de la fe y renovación de votos," of sor Juana Inés de al Cruz
"Diego Calleja, biógrafo. El zurriago," by Luis de Salazar y Castro
"Manuel Fernández de Santa Cruz, catalizador"
"Juan Ignacio de Castorena, editor"
"Dorothy Schons, primera crítica"

Toluca: Instituto Mexiquense de Cultural, 2014. ISBN 978-607-758-8986

- De Juana Inés de Asuaje a Sor Juana Inés de la Cruz: El libro de las profesiones del Convento de San Jerónimo. Toluca: Editorial del Instituto de Cultura Mexiquense del Gobierno del Estado de México, 2013. ISBN 978-607-490-170-2
- Con la coautoría de Olga Martha Peña Doria; La Revolución y el Nacionalismo en el teatro mexicano. Guadalajara: Universidad de Guadalajara, 2013. Con la coautoría de Olga Martha Peña Doria. ISBN 978-607-450-700-3
- "El dramaturgo mexicano Rodolfo Usigli en Biblioteca Cervantes Virtual," en Representaciones y acontecimientos. Argentina: Ediciones Galerna, 2013; Dorothy Schons, la primera sorjuanista. Argentina: DUNKEN, 2012. ISBN 978-987-02-6275-6
- Indagaciones sobre la comedia perdida de Sor Juana Inés de la Cruz: La Segunda Celestina. España-Alemania: Editorial Académica Española EAE, 2012. ISBN 978-3-659-04990-3
- "El final de sor Juana y sus cinco últimos escritos," en El español, integrador de culturas. USA: Editorial Orbis Press, 2012. ISBN 9781931139700
- Retratos teatrales: cinco obras de Teatro de Guillermo Schmidhuber: En busca de un hogar sólido I y II: Obituario; Alcanzar el unicornio; Travesía hacia la libertad; y ¿Quién cabalga el caballo de Troya? Monterrey: Editorial de la Universidad de Nuevo León, 2012. ISBN 978-607-433-699-3
- "Una Dramaturgia que Corre el Riesgo del Teatro," La vuelta al signo. Análisis discursivos y semióticos actuales de la literatura mexicana. Guadalajara: Universidad de Guadalajara, 2012. ISBN 978-607-450-5
- Travesía a la libertad, en Literatura dramática contemporánea de Jalisco, Tomo I. Guadalajara: Secretaría de Cultura del gobierno de Estado de Jalisco, 2012. ISBN 978-607-9016-73-9
- Encubrimientos y silencios en contra de Juana Inés de Asuaje/Sor Juana Inés de la Cruz, en Reflexiones en torno a la escritura femenina. México: Universidad Michoacana de San Nicolás de Hidalgo, y Universidad de Guadalajara, 2011. ISBN 978-607-424-240-9
- Toponimia literaria en tres ensayos. Alemania: Editorial Académica Española, 2011. ISBN 978-3-8465-7132-3
- Los cinco últimos escritos de Sor Juana Inés de la Cruz. Toluca, México: Instituto Mexiquense de Cultura, 2011. ISBN 978-607-490-086-6
- Segunda Edición; "Dramasutra o Farsa del Diablo dramaturgo," en Teatro mexicano contemporáneo. Argentina: Emergentes editorial, 2010. Con un estudio preliminar de Olga Martha Peña Doria. ISBN 978-987-24940-7-0
- "Una dramaturgia que corre el riesgo del teatro," en Búsquedas y discursos. Buenos Aires: Grupo de Estudios del Teatro Argentino e Iberoamericano y Galerna, 2010. Editor Osvando Pelletieri. pp. 131–136. ISBN 978-950-556-561-0
- "Prólogo a Posturas nacionalistas en el teatro mexicano" (1921-1939), de Pablo Parga Parga. Zacatecas: Universidad Autónoma de Zacatecas, 2010. ISBN 978-607-9087-05-0
- "Teatro de caníbales versus teatro de colegas: armonía y desarmonía en el teatro mexicano," en Ensayos sobre literatura mexicana II. Guadalajara: Universidad de Guadalajara, 2010. pp. 47–56. ISBN 978-970-27-2005-8
- "Teatro visionario: Juan Bustillo Oro y Mauricio Magdaleno," en Visiones contemporáneas sobre literatura mexicana. Guadalajara: Universidad de Guadalajara, 2010. pp. 91–98. ISBN 978-607-450-240-4
- "Mi amiga Elena Garro," en En torno a la convención y la novedad. Buenos Aires: Galerna y Fundación Roberto Arlt, 2009. 105–111. ISBN 978-950-556-551-1
- "Jalisco. Del origen a la globalización." México: Plaza y Valdés, 2009. ISBN 978-607-402-143-1
- "Las ideas de la revolución mexicana en dos obras de Rodolfo Usigli: El gesticulador y Las madres, en El español, baluarte del humanismo: Literatura, lengua y cultura. Estados Unidos: Asociación Hispánica de Humanidades, 2009. ISBN 1-931139-61-X
- Los cinco últimos escritos de Sor Juana Inés de la Cruz. Toluca, México: Instituto Mexiquense de Cultura, 2008. ISBN 968-484-665-7

== Family ==
Guillermo Schmidhuber is the son of Guillermo Schmidhuber y Martínez (1913–1945) and Josefina de la Mora y Peña (1913–1990). He lives in Guadalajara, Mexico, where he continues writing plays and articles in the company of his wife and three children.

== Notes and references ==
=== General citations ===
1. Dictionary of Mexican Literature (search term: "G. Schmidhuber"), Eladio Cortés (ed.), Greenwood Press (1992); OCLC 463936838
2. Sueños: Aproximaciones a la Dramaturgia de Guillermo Schmidhuber, by Lourdes Betanzos, Ediciones Universal (2006); OCLC 837018633
3. "El armario de las abuelas de Guillermo Schmidhuber de la Mora: Articulación de la imagen femenina en una genealogía de mujeres" (en Antología crítica del teatro breve hispanoamericano, 1948–1993), by Magda Castellvi de Moor, Antología Crítica del Teatro Breve Hispanoamericano, Medellín (publisher), Colombia: University of Antioquia, 1997, pps. 321–327; OCLC 38196233
4. "Burdensome Heritages in Los Herederos de Segimuno," by Denise M. DiPuccio, Revista de Literatura Latinoamerciana, Vol. 19, No 2 (November 1990): 43–50; OCLC 612330396, 769360089
5. "El Valor de la Libertad en el Teatro de Guillermo Schmidhuber de la Mora," by Christine D. Martines, Latin American Theater Review, Vol 24, No. 1 (Fall 1990): 29–39; ISSN 2161-0576, 0023-8813
6. "Hablar del Teatro: Repeticióon y Espejismo," by Bonnie Hildebrand Reynolds, Revista del Ateneo Puertorriqueño, Vol 3, No. 9 (September 1993): 169–177; OCLC 28365154
7. "¿El teatro riñe con la política en Por las Tierras de Colón?," by Lady Rojas-Tempe, Latin American Theatre Review, Vol. 25, No. 1 (Fall 1991): pps. 115–122; ISSN 2161-0576, 0023-8813
