= House of Desires =

Play by Sor Juana Inés de la Cruz

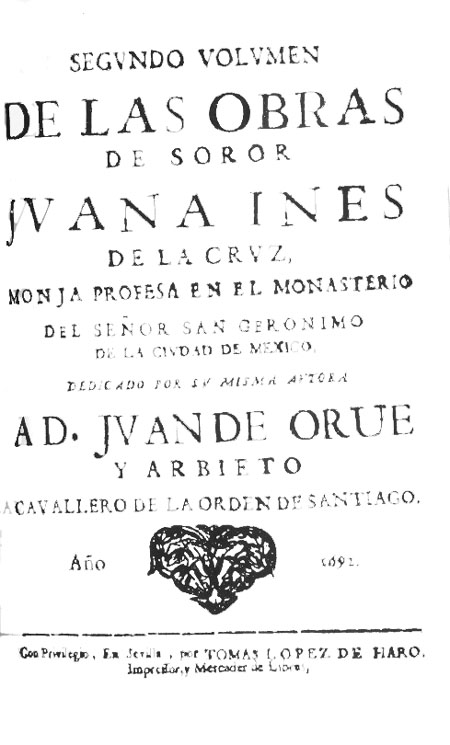
Front cover of Sor Juana's second volume of works, including Los empeños de una casa.

Los empeños de una casa (House of Desires) is one of Sor Juana Inés de la Cruz's dramatic literary pieces. It was first performed on 4 October 1683, during the birthday celebrations held for the first-born child of the Viceroy Count of Paredes; of which coincided with the entry of the new archbishop of Mexico City, Francisco de Aguiar y Seijas.

The tale centers around two couples pining to be together but prevented from doing so by uncontrollable circumstances. This comedy of intrigue is deemed one of the most famous works from late-Baroque Spanish-American literature. It has the unique characteristic of having the leading lady be a nun, who is strong-willed, and determined, and who openly expresses her frustrated wants and desires.

This work is considered in many circles to be the pinnacle of Sor Juana's pieces both in verse and throughout all Mexican literature. From the manner it handles intrigue, to the representation of the complicated system of conjugal relationships and the vicissitudes found within urban life, each aspect intertwines to make The House of Desire a rare theatric piece of colonial Latin America.

== Synopsis ==
At the beginning of the piece Doña Ana of Arellano and her brother Don Pedro are residing in Madrid, but must move to Toledo for business opportunities. In Madrid, Juan of Vargas meets Doña Ana and follows her to Toledo, where all the following comedic story arcs take place. In Toledo, however, Doña Ana believes she is falling in love with Carlos de Olmedo, who does not reciprocate her affections, because he is in a romantic relationship with Doña Leonor de Castro, whom Don Pedro has claimed for himself. Don Rodrigo, Leonor's father, disapproves of his daughter's engagement to Carlos, and for this reason Carlos and Leonor set up a plan to run away together to force the marriage to be accepted.

Ana then discovers that she and Leonor love the same man, and shortly afterwards Don Carlos and his servant Castaño arrive at the Arellano's house as fugitives from justice. Ana provides them with asylum, and the plot becomes more entangled when Celia, Dona Ana's trusted maid, also brings Juan de Vargas into lodge in their home. In the dark, Juan rebukes Ana for her lack of love. But because he cannot see, he does not realize that it is not Ana but Leonor. Carlos hears Juan's voice and leaves, but each one of them speaks with different people without realizing that they are talking to other characters. When the light comes back, carried by Celia, everyone is in a state of confusion and Juan and Leonor assume that Ana is Carlos's lover. However, Carlos' chivalry prevents him from doubting Leonor's love, which will be a constant theme throughout the entire work.

Carlos then sends his servant, Castaño, under threats, to explain the dismal situation to Leonor's father. In order not to be recognized, Castaño dresses in some of Leonor's clothes, which leads to more moments of comedic confusion. Outfitted as Leonor, he encounters Pedro, who is baffled by the odd behavior, and at first perceives it as a mockery of his beloved. Then the servant changes his approach and pretends to be Leonor and attempts to escape by promising Pedro that she will be his wife by the end of that very night. After many humorous scenes of mistaking individuals for each other, the story ends happily for the majority: Carlos and Leonor remain together, as do Ana and Juan and Castaño and Celia. However, Don Pedro remains single, primarily as punishment as he caused the main deception in a vain effort to steal a woman not destined for him away from her significant other.

== Festival Theatre ==
Sor Juana penned The House of Desire in celebration of José, the son of Tomás de la Cerda y Aragón and wife María Luisa Manrique de Lara y Gonzaga (nicknamed "Lysi" by the nuns in her community), who were Marquises of La Laguna and Viceroys of New Spain, as well as significant patrons of the poet. In the words of Francisco Monterde, the piece represents "a comprehensive program of Mexican baroque theatre." The short works of the stage performance maintain a close stylistic and thematic relationship with the drama itself, which makes separating the performance piece from the original drama almost impossible.

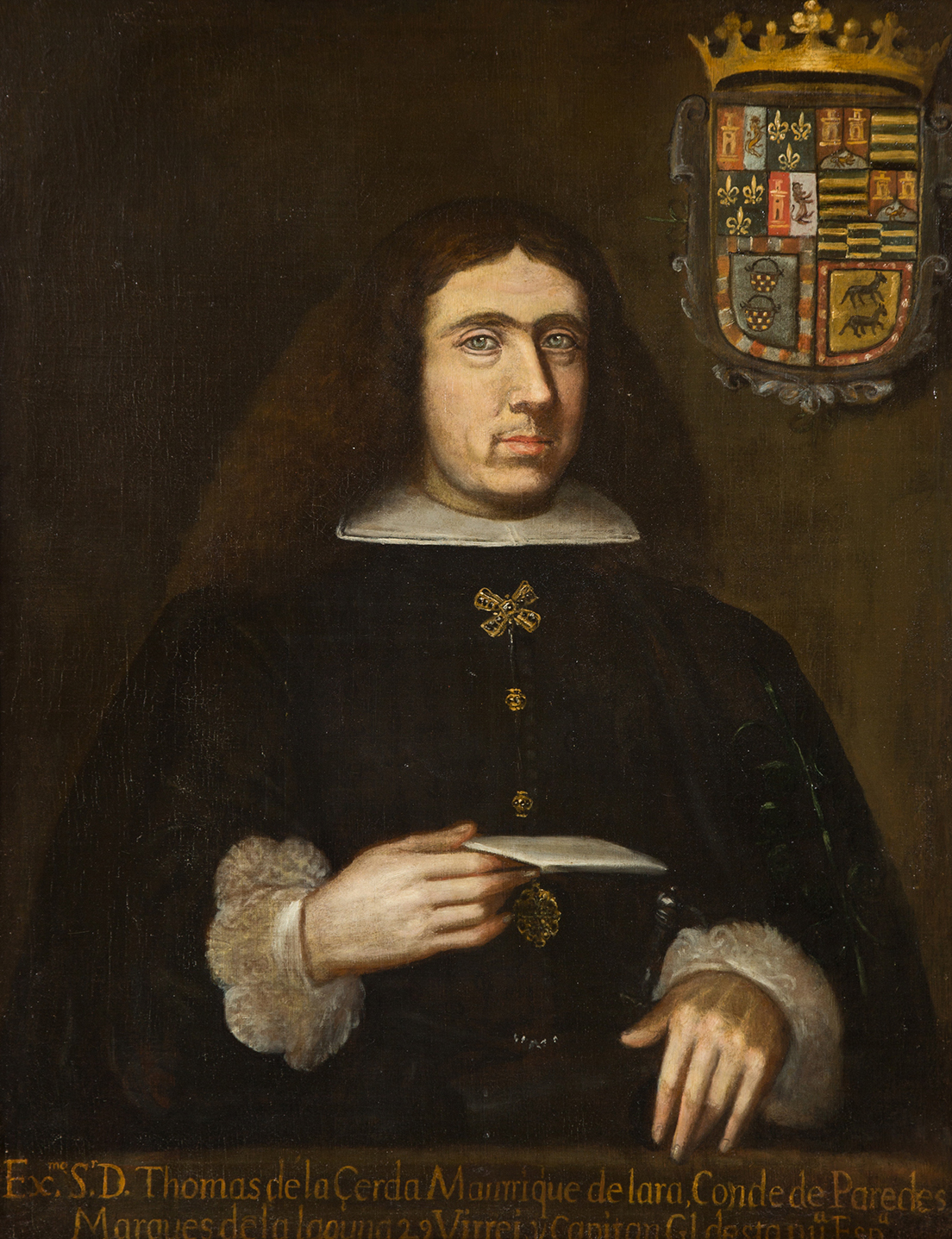
Tomás Antonio of la Cerda and Aragón, Marquis of La Laguna and Count Consort of Paredes, 28th Viceroy of New Spain.

The performance, written for a cultured public accustomed to lavish performances like those of Pedro Calderón de la Barca, opens with a loa. The characters present throughout the loa are Fortune, Diligence, Merit, Chance, and Joy. The play's initial objective was to celebrate the birth of the viceroy's son. The final verses of the piece extend congratulations to Archbishop Aguiar, with whom Sor Juana would later have conflict.

Throughout the play, Sor Juana interspersed three songs meant to praise Lady María Luisa Manrique, whom she held in high esteem These scores are titled "Divine Lysi, Let Pass", "Beautiful María" and "Tender Beautiful Flower Bud". Each work was composed in the style of eight-syllable couplets, resulting in thirty-two verses.

The Sainete primero de palacio, sung in between the end of the first act and the beginning of the second, depicts —in the course of 202 verses— life according to Sor Juana's peculiar perspective from within the viceregal court, which she experienced first-hand during the governmental reign of Antonio Sebastián of Toledo Molina and Salazar. The Second Interlude differs little from the first; the literary value of both lie in the fact that they are deemed excellent testimonies of palace life at the time. They introduced a theatrical device which was previously unheard of in Spanish-American theater: substituting simulated gossip on stage for public comments. The Segunda sainete uses the well-known technique of the "play-within-the-play", and also alludes to the great struggles and labors of the era. The play also makes several allusions to classical Spanish literature. For example, reference is made to La Celestina, a piece written by Agustín of Salazar and Torres, and for which Sor Juana herself wrote the ending (this was not the work by Fernando de Rojas; that was banned). Sor Juana also affectionately pokes fun at another contemporary playwright of the monastery, Francisco de Acevedo. Both sainetes are deemed magnificent examples of literary irony and Sor Juana's admiration for the Spanish theatre's finest.

House of Desire concludes with Sarao of Four Nations, which consists of three hundred sung versus in which Spaniards, Italians, Mexicans and Black citizens dance and praise those in the seat of honor to conclude the festivities. The Italian scholar Alexandra Riccio writes that Sor Juana indirectly criticized various socio-political aspects of the colonial system, which ended with her receiving reproaches from her superiors and orders to stop writing. An example of this can be observed in this evening party scene, in which, according to Riccio, the New Spain caste order is subtly critiqued. Riccio also suggests a parallel between Sor Juana and the insurgent Friar Servando Teresa of Mier, who was censored in the same manner as Sor Juana, after a controversial sermon regarding the origins of the Virgin of Guadalupe in 1794.

== Style and analysis ==
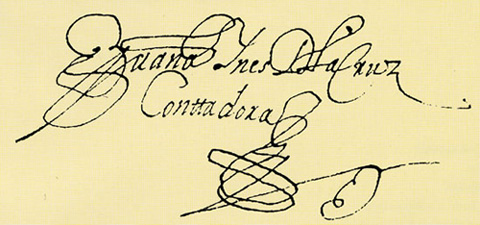
Sor Juana Inés de la Cruz's signature (1689).

Despite being a comedy, there are several sections of the work where a certain bitter truth is alluded to: the romantic failure of the San Jerónimo's Poet. Much conjecture has been made regarding Sor Juana's heartbreak, which was supposedly made metaphor to in The House of Desires, though there solid evidence for these claims does not exist.

The transvestism scene with Castaño is considered one of the most original in all swashbuckling style comedy, even though it does not deviate from the structural rules instituted by Pedro Calderón of Barca, and brings full circle the playful and comedic nature of the scene. In the baroque theatre it was considered common for male characters to adopt character traits, mannerisms, and even clothing of the opposite gender.

This swashbuckling comedy is founded in two main themes: the different forms of love and the romantic entanglements that can arise from couples. Pedro and Ana of Arellano are the perpetrators of all the dramatic scheming against the true and sincere love of Carlos and Leonor and the immature but noble love of Ana towards Juan de Vargas. These two couples contrast each other with the selfish and despot attitude regarding Don Pedro, whose love for Leonor appears to them to be motivated by his own personal gain. The pentagonal structure of the couples —five protagonists— is designed to emphasize the loneliness and punishment Pedro receives, who in the end remains an "unattached beau".

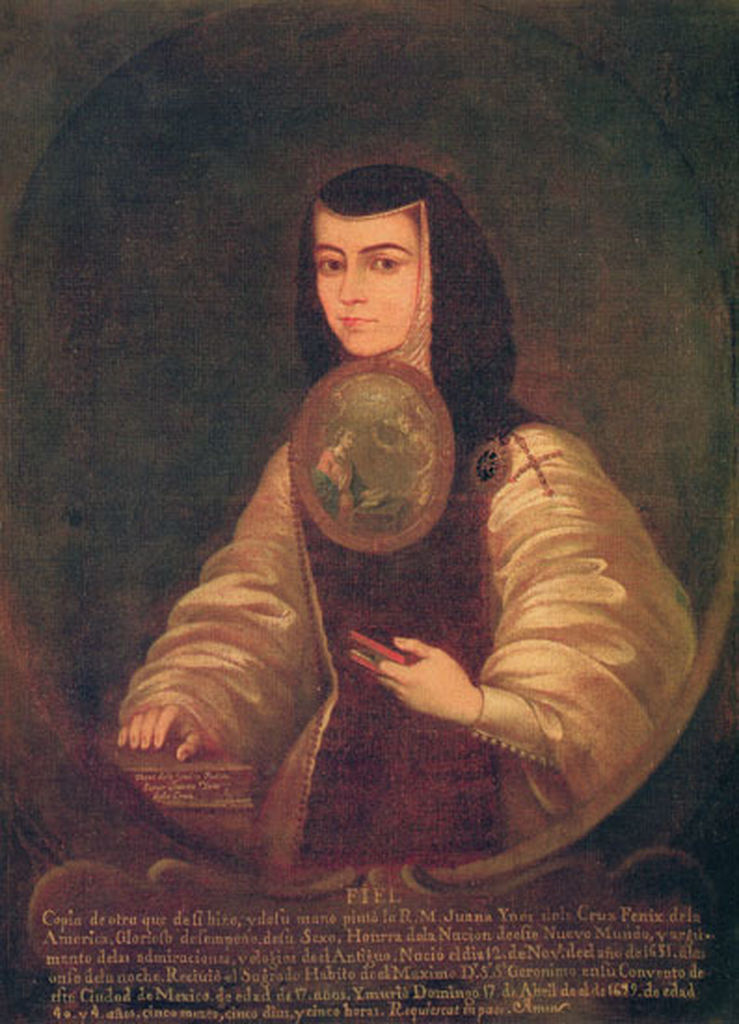
Portrait of Sor Juana, by Fray Miguel of Herrera.

The servants, Celia and Castaño, play fundamental roles in the creation and resolution of the story's entanglements and intrigue. Though they for the most part act primarily on the orders of their masters, there are occasions —for example, when Castaño dresses in Leonor's clothing— they act on their own accord. They are also the characters designated with the charge of gossiping to keep the audience aware of the plot. Sor Juana uses the character of Castaño to critique "covered ladies", a cultural custom that allowed women to hide under a cloak and say things in anonymity they would not otherwise dare to say aloud.

The main setting for the play is the Arellano household, whose labyrinthine layout greatly contributes to the play's comedic and dramatic confusion. The focal point of The House of Desire is found the moments of the entrance and exit of the characters in the middle of a dark environment. Unlike other comedies, such as The Suspicious Truth by Juan Ruiz de Alarcón, Sor Juana pays more attention to the development of the comedy than the psychology of the characters.

There are several possible influences that have been made reference to in Sor Juana's work, the primary ones being Calderón de la Barca and Lope de Vega. In The Discreet Lover, the servant Hernando disguises himself as a woman in a similar manner as Castaño. The title alludes to House of Desire, by Calderón, which for some critics leads to a "...hook meant to catch unsuspecting spectators who would turn out believing that the work was Calderón's...". On the other hand, the treatment of honor and family prestige in Sor Juana's work is very similar to that of The Voice of Misery, another Calderonian drama, though she still maintains her own unique style.

According to Alberto Pérez Amador, Leonor is an unequivocal reflection of Sor Juana's personality: disappointed by love and confined to her intellectual tasks. In the loa and the first act, the poet poses a complex question related to what the greatest pain and greatest happiness the lover experiences? Possible answers are then offered throughout the comedy. It has also been suggested that the death of Sor Juan's first love may have been the inspiration for this piece, as it was considered that after the death, she considered herself incapable of loving another and secluded herself to a convent.

In the Sor Juana's lexicon several neologisms stand out, such as "encuñadado", which is a heritage by-product of Los Sueños by Francisco de Quevedo, and the list of Latin phrases. In the grammatic syntax the romance and the redondilla reign, and in the octosyllable meter. Sor Juana plays a bit with rhythm and syllabic pentameter, which is found in several verses where she uses elongated forms of some words.

== Editions ==
=== Old editions ===
- Segundo tomo de las obras de sóror Juana Inés de la Cruz, monja profesa en el monasterio del señor San Jeronimo de la Ciudad de México, dedicado por la autora a D. Juan de Orúe y Orbieto, caballero de la Orden de Santiago. Sevilla, Tomás López de Haro, 1692. Reprinted in Barcelona, 1693 (tres ediciones). With the title Poetic Works, Madrid: 1715 and 1725. Including the auto sacramentales, la Athenagoric Letter, The Efforts of A House and Seventy More Poems.
- FAMOUS COMEDY / THE PAIRS OF VNA HOUSEHOLD / BY / IVANA INES / DE LA CRUZ / MONJA PROFESSA EN EL MONASTERIO / OF Señor San Geronimo in Mexico City. Barcelona, Josep Llopis, 1725.
- LOS EMPEÑOS DE VNA CASA / COMEDIA FAMOSA / DEL FENIX DE LA NVEVA ESPAÑA / SORORJUANA INES DE LA CRUZ. Sevilla, Tomás López de Haro, circa 1730.
- O COMEDIA FAMOSA / LOS EMPEÑOS / DE UNA CASA / DE SOR JVANA INES DE LA CRVZ, / Phenix de la Nueva España. Sevilla, Imprenta de José Padrino, 1740.
- LOS EMPEÑOS DE VNA CASA / COMEDIA FAMOSA / DEL FENIX DE LA NVEVA ESPAÑA / SORORJUANA INES DE LA CRUZ. Sevilla, Printing of the Widow of Francisco de Leefdael 1750.

=== Modern editions ===
==== Editions: Complete works and compilations ====
- Obras completas, four volumes, edition and notes by Alfonso Méndez Plancarte, México, Fondo of Economic Culture, 1951–1957. Reissue of the first volume, Personal Lyric, by Elva Ginazo, 2009. Los empeños de una is included in volume IV «Lírica y fama».
- Obra selecta: romances y otros poemas, villancicos, Neptuno alegórico, El sueño, Los empeños de una casa, El divino Narciso, Respuesta a Sor Filotea de la Cruz, edición by Luis Sáinz de Medrano, Barcelona, Planeta, 1987.
- Obras completas, prologue and edition by Francisco Monterde, México, Porrúa, 1989.

==== Recent editions ====
- Los empeños de una casa, edition by Roberto Oropeza Martínez, México, Ateneo, 1962.
- Los empeños de una casa, edited by Eva Lydia Oseguera de Chávez, México, Fernández, 1991.
- Festejo de Los empeños de una casa, México, United Mexican Editors, 1998.
- Los empeños de una casa, Alexandriaera piruja mayor, Alexander Street Press, 2007.
- Los empeños de una casa / Amor es más laberinto, critical edition, introduction and notes by Celsa Carmen García Valdés, Madrid, Cátedra, 2010.

== See also ==
- Feminist Reading of the Work of Sor Juana Inés de la Cruz

== Bibliography ==
- CHÁVEZ, Ezequiel, Sor Juana Inés de la Cruz: psychology essay, México, Porrúa, 1970. ISBN 978-970-07-2619-9.
- GARCÍA VALDÉS, Celsa Carmen, The House of Desire / Love Is More Labyrinth, Madrid, Cátedra, 2010. ISBN 978-84-376-2647-5.
- GARZA CUARÓN, Beatriz, History of Mexican Literature: From Its Origins to The Present Day, Vol. 2, México, Siglo XXI, 1996. ISBN 978-968-23-2404-8.
- GLANTZ, Margo, «De Narciso a Narciso, o de Tirso a Sor Juana: El vergonzoso en palacio y Los empeños de una casa», El escritor y la escena: actas del I Congreso de la Asociación Internacional de Teatro Español y Novohispano de los Siglos de Oro, 18–21 March 1992, México, University of the City of Juárez, 1993. ISBN 968-6287-52-3.
- HERNÁNDEZ ARAICO, Susana, «La innovadora fiesta barroca de Sor Juana: Los empeños de una casa», El escritor y la escena V. Estudios sobre teatro español y novohispano de los Siglos de Oro: homenaje a Marc Vitse, México, University of the City of University of the City of Juárez, 1997. ISBN 978-968-6287-905.
- —, «El espacio escénico de Los empeños de una casa y algunos antecedentes calderonianos», El teatro en la Hispanoamérica colonial, Madrid, Iberoamericana, 2008. ISBN 84-8489-326-X.
- MAINER, José Carlos, y Gonzalo Pontón, Historia de la literatura española, el siglo del arte nuevo: 1598–1691, Madrid, Crítica, 2010. ISBN 84-9892-069-8.
- POOT HERRERA, Sara, Sobre el segundo sainete de Los empeños de una casa, Teatro, historia y sociedad, México, Universidad Autónoma de Ciudad Juárez, 1996. ISBN 84-7684-662-2.
