= Hunger's Brides =

Novel by W. Paul Anderson

Hunger's Brides is a historical and biographical novel written by Canadian author W. Paul Anderson. The novel deals with the life of the 17th century Mexican scholar and poet Sor Juana Inés de la Cruz, interwoven with a modern narrative. Subtitled A Novel of the Baroque, it is epic in scope, nearly 1500 pages long, and represents twelve years of work by the author.

A shorter version of the novel has been published as Sor Juana or the Breath of Heaven: The Essential Story from the Epic, Hunger's Brides.
