= Francisco de Trillo y Figueroa =

Spanish poet and historian (1618–1680)

Francisco de Trillo y Figueroa (1618/1620–1680) was a Spanish poet and historian. He was adherent to the Baroque movement Culteranismo and wrote epithalamiums as well as panegyrics. He has been described as a possible influence on Juana Inés de la Cruz.

== Biography ==
Trillo y Figueroa was born in the parish San Pedro de Cerbás, Ares, Spain, to José de Trillo and Juana Flores de León between 1618 and 1620. When Trillo y Figueroa was 11 years old, his family moved to Granada after de Trillo received inheritance from his uncle. He and his brother, Juan, then received an education, including literature, there. He participated in the poetic environment at a young age. This early exposure is attributed as where his mastery in satire derived. His brother became interested in genealogy, publishing Origen de la casa de Tobar y árbol genealógico de don Francisco Cañavera in 1662 and Noticia de la sucesión de doña María Nuñez Cabeza de Vaca in 1664.

He served in Italy for the military and upon his return to Spain dedicated himself to poetry and history.

On 20 November 1640, Trillo y Figueroa married Leonor de Trillo y Figueroa, a distant relative. They had three sons named Juan Francisco, José, and Diego, on 2 February 1643, 16 September 1645, and 29 February 1648, respectively. He was the godfather of his grandson Diego's baptism in 1678.

He was close friends with Pedro Soto de Rojas and annotated his work, Paraíso cerrado para muchos, jardines abiertos para pocos.

A death certificate states a "Francisco de Trillos y Figueroa" was buried in parish Santiago, Granada on 25 October 1680, coinciding with the death year in sources.

== Works ==
=== Published ===
- Epitalamio en las felicísimas bodas de los señores don Francisco Ruto de Vergara y Álava, del consejo de sn majestad, y doña Guiomar Venegas, hija de los condes de Luque, 1649
- Epitalamio al himeneo de don Juan Ruiz de Vergara y Dávila, señor de Villoría, y doña Luisa de Córdoba y Ayala, hija de los señores marquese de Valenzuela, 1650
- Panegírico natalicio al excelentísimo señor marqués de Montalvan y Villalba, primogénito del excelentísimo señor marqués de Priego, duque de Feria, etc, 1650
- Notas al panegírico de el señor marqués de Montalvan, respondiendo á un curioso en otras facultades, que pidió se le declarase la idea y argumento de este poema, 1651
- Neapolisea, poema heroico y panegírico al gran capitán Gonzalo Fernández de Córdoba, dirigida al excelentísimo señor don Luis Fernandez de Córdoba y Figueroa, marqués de Priego, 1651
- Poesías varias heroicas y satíricas y amorosas, 1652
- Panegyrico sacro en la fiesta que celebró la ciudad de Granada, día del Corpus, 1661

=== Unpublished ===
- Historia política del Rey Católico, 1652
- Epítome de la historia del rey Enrique IV de Francia, 1652
- Historia y antigüedades del reino de Galicia y su nobleza, 1652
- Antigüedades de la ciudad de Granada, 1652
- Notas y adversarios á los autores de la historia antigua de España, 1652
- Discursos políticos y militares, 1652
- Cartas, 1652
- Discursos cronológicos, 1652
- Blasones y armas de la nobleza de España, 1652

== Bibliography ==
- Cárdenas, Jesús Ponce. "Francisco de Trillo y Figueroa | Real Academia de la Historia". dbe.rah.es. Real Academia de la Historia.
- Castro, Adolfo de (1854). Poetas líricos de los siglos XVI y XVII. Madrid : M. Rivadeneyra.
- Coke, M. R. (1980). "Review of El 'Sueño' de Sor Juana Inés de la Cruz". The Modern Language Review. 75 (2): 427–428. doi:10.2307/3727737. ISSN 0026-7937.
- Durán, Abraham Madroñal (2021). "Poemas y problemas de un libro único: primeros versos de Francisco de Trillo y Figueroa en las «Novelas» de Ginés Carrillo Cerón". RILCE. Revista de Filología Hispánica. 38 (1): 151–70. doi:10.15581/008.38.1.151-70. hdl:10171/63999.
- de Lope, Paciencia Ontañon (1991). "Review of La teoría poética en el Manierismo y Barroco españoles". Nueva Revista de Filología Hispánica. 39 (2): 1142–1144. ISSN 0185-0121.
- Pozo, Juan Luis Arcaz (1989). "Catulo en la literatura española". Cuadernos de Filología Clásica. Estudios Griegos e Indoeuropeos. 22: 249–286.
