= Tarsicio Herrera Zapién =

Mexican writer, researcher and academic (1935–2026)

Tarsicio Herrera Zapién (19 July 1935 – 8 January 2026) was a Mexican writer, researcher and academic, specializing in the culture and classical literature. He studies the works of Sister Juana Inés de la Cruz, as well as music composition and recovery of classical musicological works.

== Biography ==
Tarsicio Herrera Zapién was born 19 July 1935 in Churintzio, Michoacán, Mexico. Herrera earned a degree in philosophy from the Pontifical Gregorian University in Rome in 1955.

He completed his Bachelor's (1967), Master's (1968) and Doctorate (1970) degrees in classical literature at the National Autonomous University of Mexico (UNAM). For over 45 years he has been a professor in his alma mater being the dean in Classics. He has taught Latin, literature and classical tradition in Faculty of Arts. He also holds a diploma in musical composition.

He was vice president of the Mexican Academy of Doctors in Social and Human Sciences from 1996-2000 and president in 2000. He has been Senior researcher at the Institute of Philological Research of the National Autonomous University of Mexico since 1973 and also is an academician of the Mexican Academy of Language. He was elected full member of the Mexican Academy of Language on May 12, 1983, he took up the chair IV on 9 February 1984. He has served as the Academy of Language's 14th secretary from 1999 to 2000, and the 9th statuary censor since 2008.

He has written articles and collaborated with magazines and newspapers, including the Diario Reforma; Diario YA de Madrid; El Heraldo Cultural; Memorias de la Academia Mexicana de la Lengua: Tomos XXV, XXVI, XXVII, XXIX, and XXXI; Nova Tellus del CEC; Revista de Literatura Mexicana IIFL; Revista Plural; Revista de la Universidad Central de Venezuela; and Revista de la Universidad Nacional de México. His body of work is diverse. He has written essays on classicism, essays on Sister Juana Inés de la Cruz, translations of classics from Latin to Spanish, Spanish translations of works into Latin, as well as musicological works. Herrera has published over 30 books and has done work to recover such works as the lyrical Castilian albums of patriotic and sacred songs by Jesús Guízar Villanueva, as well as studying the works of Francisco José Cabrera. Herrera has composed music and is also a pianist and organist.

Herrera died in Mexico City on 8 January 2026, at the age of 90, from influenza.

== Awards and honors ==
- National Literature Prize "Ramon Lopez Velarde", awarded by FONAPAS, Zacatecas in 1979 and 1980.
- Cultural Society "Sor Juana" award in 1980 and 1982.
- Prize National University of Arts in Teaching awarded by the Autonomous National University of Mexico in 1992.
- Honorable mention in the competition "A. Millars Carlo", Las Palmas de Gran Canaria, Spain, in 1999.
- National Prize "Manuel José Othón", San Luis Potosí, in 2007.

== Selected works ==
=== Essays ===
- López Velarde y Sor Juana, feministas opuestos (1984) (in Spanish)
- Buena fe y humanismo en Sor Juana (1984) (in Spanish)
- Bernal, perenne voz de Navidad (1990) (in Spanish)
- México exalta y censura a Horacio (1991) (in Spanish)
- Manuel M. Ponce y el triunfo sobre una estrella (1992) (in Spanish)
- Horacio, crisol bimilenario (1994) (in Spanish)
- Tres siglos y cien vidas de Sor Juana (1995) (in Spanish)
- Los satíricos de la Roma imperial (1995) (in Spanish)
- Historia del humanismo mexicano (2000) (in Spanish)
- El imperio novelístico romano (2003) (in Spanish)

=== Translations ===
- Horacio. Arte poética (1970) (Latin to Spanish)
- Horacio. Epístolas (1972) (Latin to Spanish)
- Ovidio, Heroidas (1979) (Latin to Spanish)
- Ovis nigra de A. Monterroso (1988) (Spanish to Latin)
- Fray Diego Valadés. Rhetorica christiana (1989) (Latin to Spanish)
- Cuarenta poemas mexicanos universales (1989) (Spanish to Latin)
- Villancicos de ambos mundos, de seis lenguas al latín (2008) (Spanish to Latin)

=== Musicological works ===
- Bernal, perenne voz de Navidad, con cien páginas de música de M. Bernal J. (1990)
- Manuel M. Ponce y el triunfo sobre una estrella (1992)
- Obertura Festival académico, versión coral en latín, de J. Brahms (recorded 1996)
- Tríptico primaveral, para piano (2001)
- Navidad en Morelia, fantasía para piano (2001)
- Noche de paz y campanas, sonatina para piano (2005)

=== Other ===
In collaboration with Doctor Julio Pimentel A., he wrote "Etimología Grecolatina del Español The first edition of this book on the Greek and Latin etymology of the Spanish language was in 1971.
