= La Respuesta a Sor Filotea de la Cruz =

1691 letter by Sor Juana Inés de la Cruz

This anthology of Sor Juana's literary works, published in 1714, was the first that included La Respuesta.

La Respuesta a Sor Filotea de la Cruz is a theological defense letter written by Sor Juana Inés de la Cruz in 1691. Sor Juana constructed this defense in response to a letter written by Catholic bishop Manuel Fernández de Santa Cruz, who used the pen name "Sor Filotea." La Respuesta was the first work written in the Western Hemisphere that defends women's right to an education.

== Historical context ==
According to scholars, La Respuesta is best understood within the context of preceding letters written to and by Sor Juana. These letters include Fernández de Santa Cruz's initial letter to Sor Juana, Letter from Sor Filotea, as well as Sor Juana's letter to her confessor, Antonio Núñez de Miranda.

=== Letter to Her Confessor (1681) ===
Sor Juana's signature, which would have appeared at the end of her letters.

Sor Juana's letter to her confessor was written in 1681 and predates La Respuesta by approximately ten years. Originally written for a private audience, this letter was not discovered until 1980. Though the low point of Mexican Inquisition-era censorship occurred approximately fifty years before Sor Juana wrote to her confessor, Sor Juana expressed frustration at her confessor primarily because of his repeated public censure of her and her ideas. This repeated censuring arose from the Mexican Inquisition-era historical context, seeing that heresy was of particular concern in Mexico during this time because the country was a newer Catholic territory. According to scholar Nina M. Scott, Núñez de Miranda's public censure of Sor Juana was emblematic of her grievances with the church. In her letter to her confessor, Sor Juana scrutinizes the Catholic church's culture, accusing the imperial establishment of authoritarianism and sexism. Scott asserts that this letter was likely the basis for Sor Juana's letter to Sor Filotea, noting that it was a space where Sor Juana could privately and safely articulate her frustration regarding her treatment as a woman interested in the arts and sciences.

=== Letter from Sor Filotea (1690) ===
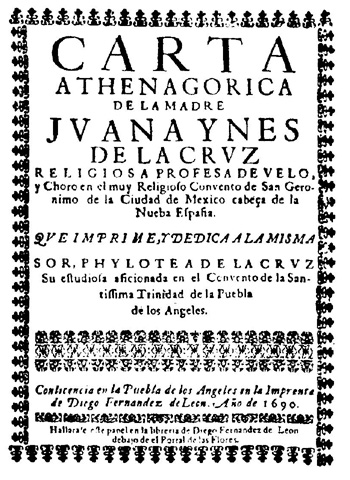
Sor Filotea included his letter as a preface to Sor Juana's Carta Atenagórica.

"Sor Filotea", or Manuel Fernández de Santa Cruz, published his letter to Sor Juana in 1690. At this time, he was the bishop of Tlaxcala (Puebla de los Ángeles). The letter was published as a preface to Sor Juana's "Carta Atenagórica", or "Letter Worthy of Athena", a work that debated theological claims made in a sermon given by Antonio Viera, a Portuguese Jesuit. In his letter, Fernández de Santa Cruz took on the persona of a woman and reprimanded Sor Juana for studying the humanities and writing poetry. He asserted that Sor Juana's studies were "vain pursuits" seeing that in his eyes, these studies were not centered in Christian theology. He claimed that studies within the humanities and other fields must be conducted within the context of Christianity; otherwise, academic pursuits serve no valid purpose. Though Fernández de Santa Cruz never claimed that women should not have the right to an education in his address to Sor Juana, he was renowned for reinforcing the status quo regarding women's gender roles, especially in his position as founder of a convent in 1680. Using the rhetorical strategy of appealing to male authority, Fernández de Santa Cruz insinuated that Sor Juana's salvation was at stake if she did not heed his words and halt her studies. Three months after its publication, Sor Juana responded to the letter, using rhetorical strategies to address every claim made by Fernández de Santa Cruz.

== Critical analyses ==
Scholars have discussed the significance of Sor Juana's La Respuesta in many fields, including literary studies and philosophy. Some scholars assert that La Respuesta shows Sor Juana's command of multiple literary genres and traditions, including the sermon and the imitatio Christi (imitation of Christ).

Scholars emphasize the different strategies and genres Sor Juana used to represent herself as a woman of letters. In her letter to Sor Filotea, Sor Juana's justification for writing was done through her expression of her obedience. Scholars identify satire, imitation, self-presentation, digression, and vivid descriptions as way to address controversies of her involvement in theology.

La Respuesta a Sor Filotea de la Cruz demonstrated the ongoing conflict between Sor Juana and the church to defend women education. La Respuesta is addressed to Sor Filotea de la Cruz, the pseudonym of Manuel Fernández de Santa Cruz. Sor Juana combines secular and religious references to defend herself and not remain silent, using scripture to argue that women belong in theological discourse.

The rhetoric of humility in La Respuesta has been recognized by scholars as a tactic for Sor Juana's voice to be heard beyond the church, especially to male leaders. Scholars have recognized that Sor Juana's work had its limitations because she was a woman. The use of biblical figures and self presentation is examined by scholars to make parallel to Saint Teresa's hagiography.

== Influences ==
Scholars have evaluated Sor Juana's influence today, with her presence on Mexican currency. Marked as the first feminist to defend women through literary text, Sor Juana has been recognized for her influence on literature as a woman on Mexico's 100 and 200 peso bills.

=== Querelle des femmes ===
Querelle des femmes (dispute of women) is a literary strategy used to debate and defend women against misogynistic counterarguments. Querelle des femmes was a tool used for feminist discourse on gender differences that dealt with social neglect of various factors such as social, legal, and intellectual. The style of genre built the foundation for female writers to enhance and move forward with the feminist movement and voice feminist issues. Writers used the genre of writing to expose misogynistic messages against those in power and authority, using biblical, classical, and contemporary writings to defend women.

The work of Sor Juana Inés de la Cruz was influenced by querelle des femmes to argue women's right to education. La respuesta a Sor Filotea includes querelle des femmes by devoting space in the writing, comparing herself (Sor Juana Inés de la Cruz) to Christ and His suffering. Sor Juana's use of Christ as a model King elevated her representation and of queens in her writing. Scholars interpret Sor Juana's use of exegesis as a way to teach to Sor Filotea.

=== Saint Teresa ===
Scholars have linked Sor Juana's writing to Saint Teresa hagiography and rhetoric style. Sor Juana's use of epistemic humility parallels to the self efficacy Teresa uses in language strategy to be heard in the church.
