= Ediciones Universal =

Publishing house in Miami, Florida

Ediciones Universal is a publishing house founded in Miami, Florida, US, in 1965 by Juan Manuel and Marta O. Salvat. The biggest publishing house among the Cuban exile community, it is largely dedicated to publishing material critical of the communist Cuban leader Fidel Castro. Ediciones Universal's website describes its mission as "to rescue essential works of Cuban culture and make them available to readers."

The company claims responsibility for publishing over 1,000 Spanish-language texts by expatriate Cuban authors. Though political, social and biographical works make up the majority of its collection, Ediciones Universal also publishes literary works as well as books on art, photography, Afro-Cuban interest and other topics.

Notable authors whose works have appeared under the Ediciones Universal imprint include the columnist Carlos Alberto Montaner, the activist businessman Enrique Ros and the writer Reinaldo Arenas. The company provides literature and scholarly articles to Florida International University in co-operation with the university's Latin American & Caribbean Information Center.
