= Theresa A. Yugar =

Latina feminist liberation theologian

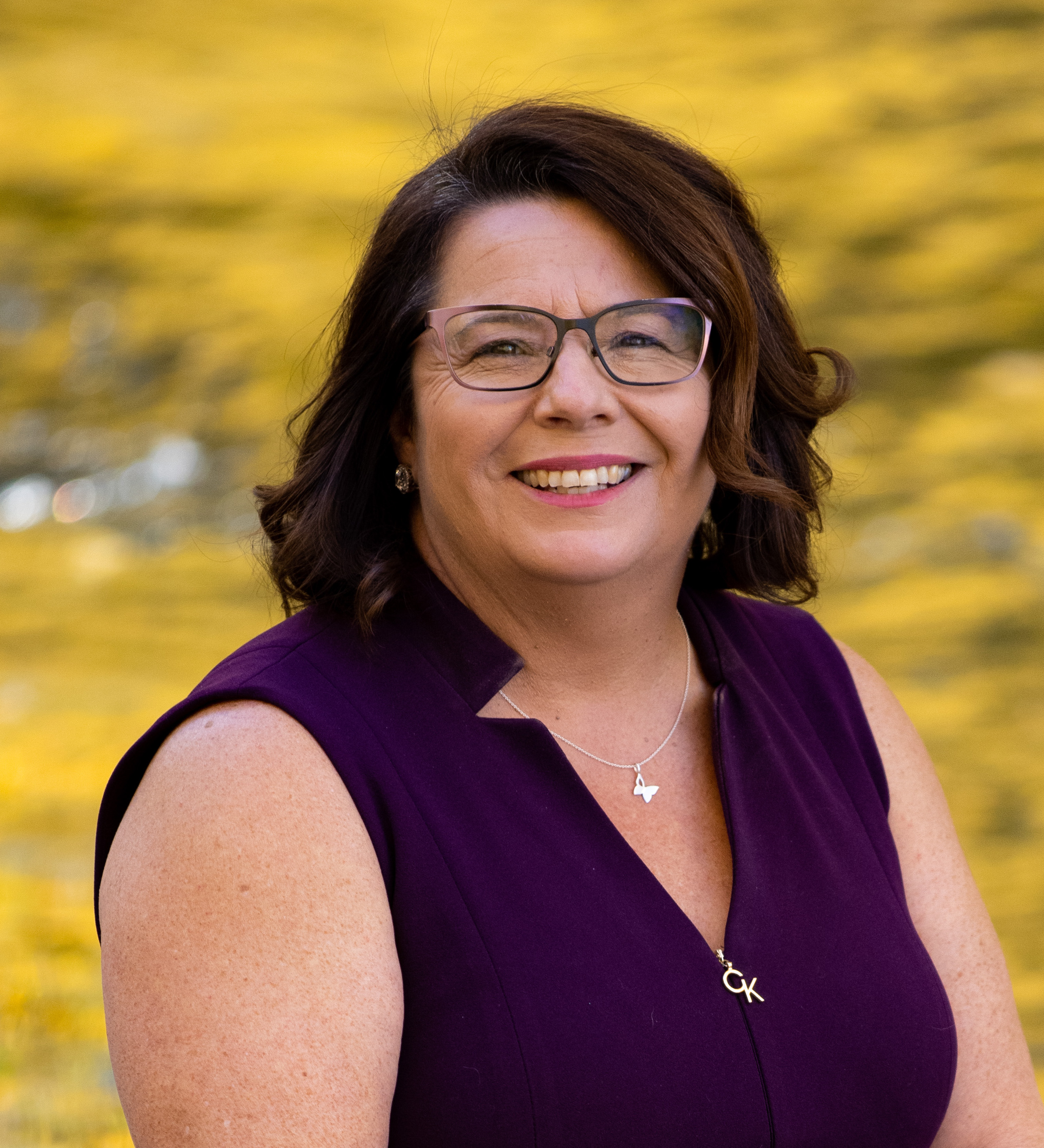
- Born: Theresa A. Yugar

Academic background
- Education: Harvard Divinity School; Claremont Graduate University

Academic work
- Discipline: Theology
- Institutions: California State University, Los Angeles
- Main interests: Feminist theology; Liberation theology
- Notable works: Sor Juana Inés de la Cruz: Feminist Reconstruction of Biography and Text (2014); Ted-Ed Animation entitled History’s Worst Nun (2019)

Theresa A. Yugar is a Latina feminist liberation theologian and a lecturer at California State University in Los Angeles, notable for her work on the 17th-century nun, Sor Juana Inés de la Cruz.

== Education and career ==
Yugar earned a Master of Divinity from Harvard Divinity School in 1997, and later completed a Ph.D. from Claremont Graduate University in 2013. She is the recipient of a Fulbright and Hispanic Theological Initiative Fellowship, and Scholar for the Chancellor's Doctoral Incentive Program. Her areas of expertise include Ecofeminist Theory and Praxis and Gender in colonial Latin American history. Her scholarly focus is on women, ecology, and climate change.

Yugar was a professor at Loyola Marymount University in the Women's and Gender Studies department. She currently teaches in the Chicana(o) and Latina(o) Studies and the Women's, Gender, and Sexuality Studies departments at California State University in Los Angeles.

Yugar served as co-chair of the American Academy of Religion and Society of Biblical Literature's Women's Caucus from 2013 to 2015 and as a board member on the Women's Ordination Conference from 2006 to 2009. In 2017, Yugar was part of the group Circulando Juntas ("Circling Together"), inspired by the book, Women Healing Earth, co-edited by Rosemary Ruether. She was recognized by the Peruvian consolate, which awarded her a diploma for organizing a cultural event honoring the Holy Child of Cuzco at Our Lady of the Angels Cathedral in Los Angeles.

== Published work ==
Yugar's published work includes Sor Juana Inés de la Cruz: Feminist Reconstruction of Biography and Text, where she identifies the 17th century Mexican poet and scholar Sor Juana Inés de la Cruz's life and work as a precursor to current protofeminist and ecofeminist theologies. In her review in Religious Studies Review, Melisa Ortiz Berry states that Yugar's book suggests that the life, works, and writings of de la Cruz were "an early example of Latina feminist theology" and that an eco-feminist and protofeminst awareness was embedded in her texts. Berry, who calls Yugar's book "a useful secondary source for scholars or students reading Sor Juana's original works", also states that Yugar presents de la Cruz's legacy includes what Berry calls a "Latina Liberation Ecclesiology". Although the book is "often repetitive" and assumes that the reader is familiar with de la Cruz's writings, Yugar's use of feminist theory "creates a window through which we are able to see a reflection of Sor Juana's life within the text itself and a vision for an egalitarian church". Reviewer Lisa Isherwood calls Yugar's book a "sound analysis" of de la Cruz's life and writings. Yugar's book is the basis for her 2019 Ted-Ed Animation entitled History’s Worst Nun, the second most viewed Ted-Ed Animation in 2019, with nearly 6.5 million views.

Yugar is also a co-editor of Valuing Lives, Healing Earth: Religion, Gender, and Life on Earth (2021), which includes sixteen essays that honors and builds on the work of Rosemary Radford Ruether. The book uses a diversity of creative mediums, including poetry, art, photography, and anecdotes that "both demonstrates current efforts toward equality and land restoration while also imagining new ways of being that will benefit all creatures".

=== Selected works ===
- Yugar, Theresa A., Grace Ji-Sun Kim, and Jenny Daggers, eds. "U.S. Latina Feminist Paradigm: Model of an Inclusive Twenty-first Century Ecclesiology." Reimagining with Christian Doctrines: Responding to Global Gender Injustices (2014). New York: Palgrave Macmillan, 90-104.
- ____. Sor Juana Inés de la Cruz: Feminist Reconstruction of Biography and Text (2014). Eugene, Oregon: WIPF & Stock.
- _____, Juan A. Tavárez, and Alan A. Barrera. "The Enlightened West and the Origins of Climate Change." Journal of Feminist Studies in Religion (2017). 33 (2): 167–170.
- _____. “The Healing Power of the Santuario De Chimayó: America's Miraculous Church by Brett Hendrickson” (review). Spiritus: A Journal of Christian Spirituality (2019). 147-149.
- _____. "History's 'Worst' Nun." TED-Ed Animation (2019). YouTube.
- _____. "The Envisioned Holy Andean Kingdom of Peru and the Mascapaicha Christ Child." Journal of Hispanic/Latino Theology (2021). 23 (2): 245-262.
- _____. "A Blessing to Each Other: A New Account of Jewish and Christian Relations by Rebecca Moore" (review). The Catholic Historical Review (Summer 2023).108 (3): 601-602.
- _____. "Honoring Rosemary Radford Ruether: Feminism Was Her Liberation." Journal of Feminist Theology (2023). 31 (3): 272–281.
- _____ and Janice Poss. "Introduction." Feminist Theology (2023). 31 (3): 250–257.
- _____. Feminist Theology (May 2023). "Honoring Rosemary Radford Ruether: Feminism Was Her Liberation." 31 (3): 272–281.
