= Juana Inés de la Cruz =

Mexican Catholic nun, philosopher, composer and poet (1648–1695)

Sor Juana Inés de la Cruz O.S.H.
- Juana Inés de Asbaje y Ramírez de Santillana
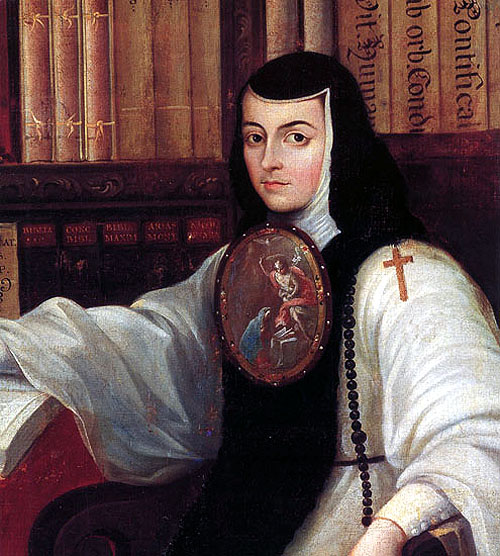
- Portrait by Miguel Cabrera, c. 1750
- Born: Juana Ramírez de Asbaje; 12 November 1648; San Miguel Nepantla, New Spain (near modern Tepetlixpa, Mexico)
- Died: 17 April 1695 (aged 46); Mexico City, New Spain
- Resting place: Convent of San Jerónimo, Mexico City
- Occupations: Nun, poet, writer, philosopher, composer
- Writing career
- Language: Spanish, Nahuatl, Latin
- Years active: c. 1660 – c. 1693
- Notable works: Carta Atenagorica; First Dream; Pawns of a House; Satira Filosofica
- Movements: Baroque, Culteranismo

Signature
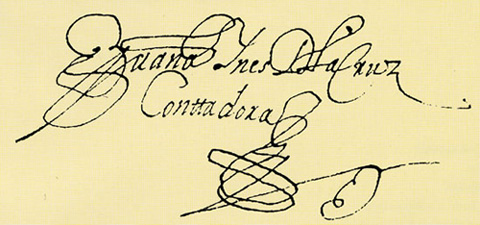

Juana Inés de Asbaje y Ramírez de Santillana, better known as Sor Juana Inés de la Cruz (Note: English: Sister Joan Agnes of the Cross) (12 November 1648 – 17 April 1695), was a Hieronymite nun and a Novohispanic writer, philosopher, composer, and poet of the Baroque period, nicknamed "The Tenth Muse", "The Mexican Phoenix", and "The Phoenix of America" by her contemporary critics. She was also a student of science. She was among the main contributors to the Spanish Golden Age, alongside Juan Ruiz de Alarcón and Garcilaso de la Vega "El Inca", and is considered one of the most important female writers in Spanish language literature and Mexican literature.

Sor Juana has been significant to many communities across time, having been presented as a candidate for Catholic sainthood, symbol of Mexican nationalism, and a paragon of freedom of speech, women's rights, and sexual diversity.

== Life ==
=== Early life ===
Juana was born in San Miguel Nepantla (presently Nepantla de Sor Juana Inés de la Cruz) near Mexico City as the daughter born outside of marriage to Don Pedro Manuel de Asuaje y Vargas-Machuca (1602-1680), a Spanish navy captain from the Canary Islands involved in colonial transatlantic shipping and trade, and Doña Isabel Ramírez de Santillana y Rendón (1626-1690), a criolla woman, whose father leased the Hacienda de Panoayan, near Mexico City.

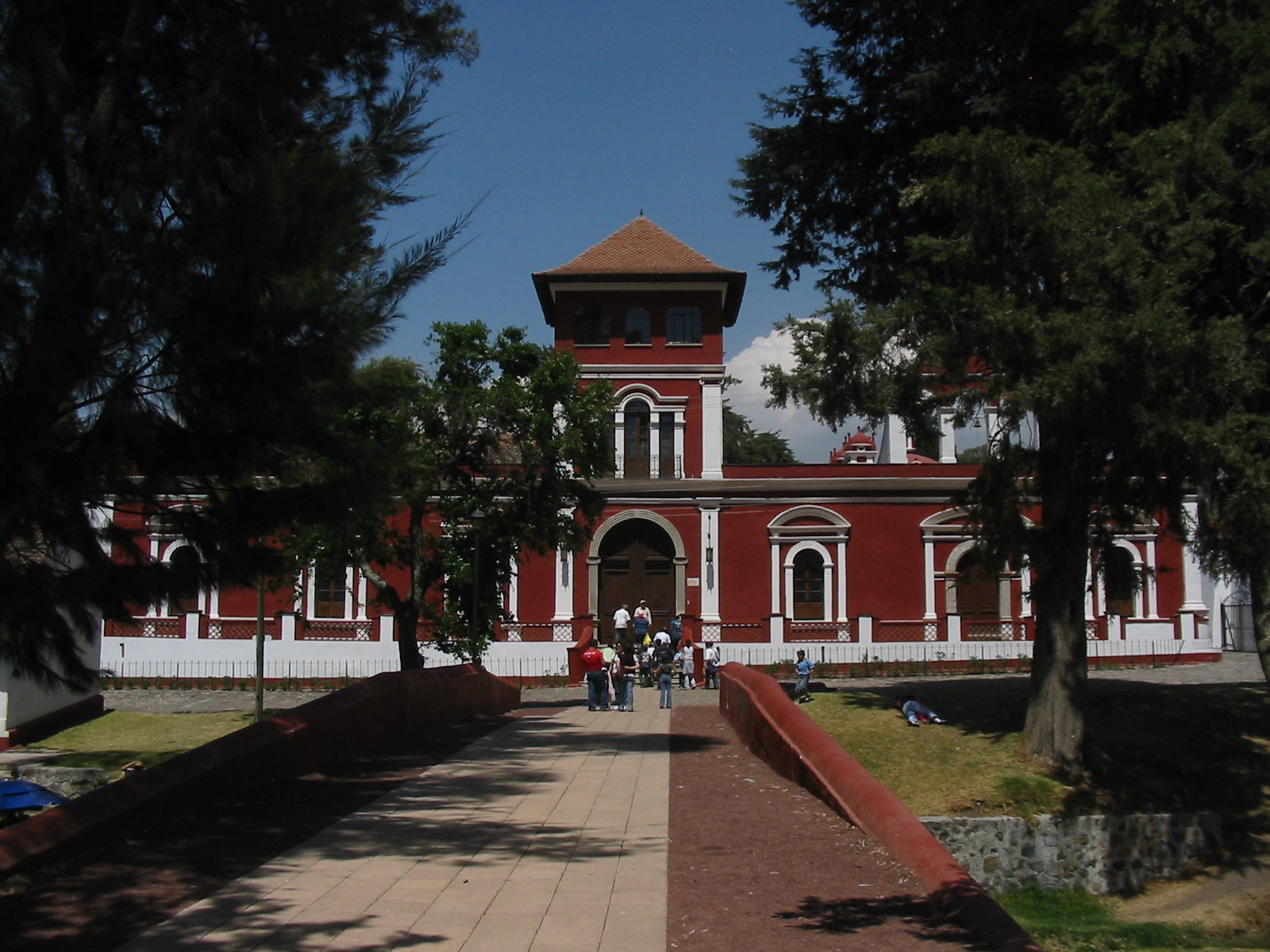
Hacienda of Panoayan in Amecameca, residence of the Ramírez de Santillana family.

There are two different baptism registrations that have been attributed to her, one under the name of "Juana" in 1648, and another one under the name of "Inés" in 1651, still a matter of academic research and debate. There is, nevertheless, agreement that she was one of the three children that Doña Isabel Ramírez de Santillana had with Don Pedro de Asuaje. Since Sor Juana's father was absent from her early life and she had limited knowledge of him, Sor Juana's infancy occurred entirely around her mother's family in the hacienda of Panaoyan, in Amecameca, leased by her maternal grandfather, and home to the Ramírez de Santillana family. Among her relatives, several women with the name "Inés" have been noted, including her grandmother Inés de Brenes, her maternal-aunt Inés Ramírez de Santillana, and her first-cousin Inés de Brenes y Mendoza, married to a grandson of Antonio de Saavedra Guzmán, the first published poet in the Americas.

"In 1656, she was sent to Mexico City by her mother to live with her maternal aunt and uncle, María Ramírez Santillana and Juan de Mata. Mexico City had around 50,000 inhabitants at the time and was the bustling heart of New Spain’s colonial life. She began her study of Latin in 1659 under the tutelage of Bachelor Martín de Olivas—it is said that she learned the language in only twenty lessons. If this is true, it is an early manifestation of the literary and linguistic genius that she demonstrated in her later work. In order to give herself motivation to study seriously, she would punish her own laziness or ineptitude by cutting her hair. " (Ford, 1892)(Archive.org)

During her childhood, Inés often hid in the hacienda chapel to read her grandfather's books from the adjoining library, despite restrictions that young girls had on access to education. By the age of three, she had learned how to read and write Latin. By the age of five, she reportedly could do accounts. At age eight, she composed a poem on the Eucharist. By adolescence, Inés had mastered Greek logic, and at age thirteen she was teaching Latin to young children. For many years, scholars believed that Sor Juana learned Nahuatl, an Aztec language, and wrote short poems in it during her childhood. However, more recent research has challenged this belief.

In 1664, at the age of 16, Inés was sent to live in Mexico City. She asked her mother's permission to disguise herself as a male student so that she could enter the university there, her request was not granted. Without the ability to obtain a formal education, Juana continued her studies privately. Through her family's social connections, she was able to obtain the position of lady-in-waiting at the colonial viceroy's court, where she came under the tutelage of the Vicereine Donna Eleonora del Carretto, a member of an Italian noble family, and wife of the Viceroy of New Spain Don Antonio Sebastián de Toledo, Marquis of Mancera. The viceroy Marquis de Mancera, wishing to test the learning and intelligence of the 17-year-old, invited several theologians, jurists, philosophers, and poets to a meeting, during which she had to answer many questions unprepared and explain several difficult points on various scientific and literary subjects. Her ability to answer difficult questions impressed those in attendance and helped establish her reputation as an intellectual. Her literary accomplishments garnered her fame throughout New Spain. She was much admired in the viceregal court, and she received several proposals of marriage, which she declined.

After joining a nunnery in 1667, Sor Juana began writing poetry and prose dealing with such topics as love, women's rights, and religion. She turned her nun's quarters into a salon, visited by New Spain's female intellectual elite, including Doña Eleonora del Carreto, Marchioness of Mancera, and Doña Maria Luisa Gonzaga, Countess of Paredes de Nava, both Vicereines of New Spain, among others. Her criticism of misogyny and the hypocrisy of men led to her condemnation by the Bishop of Puebla, and in 1694 she was forced to sell her collection of books and focus on charity towards the poor. She died the next year, having caught the plague while treating her sisters.

== Religious life and name change ==
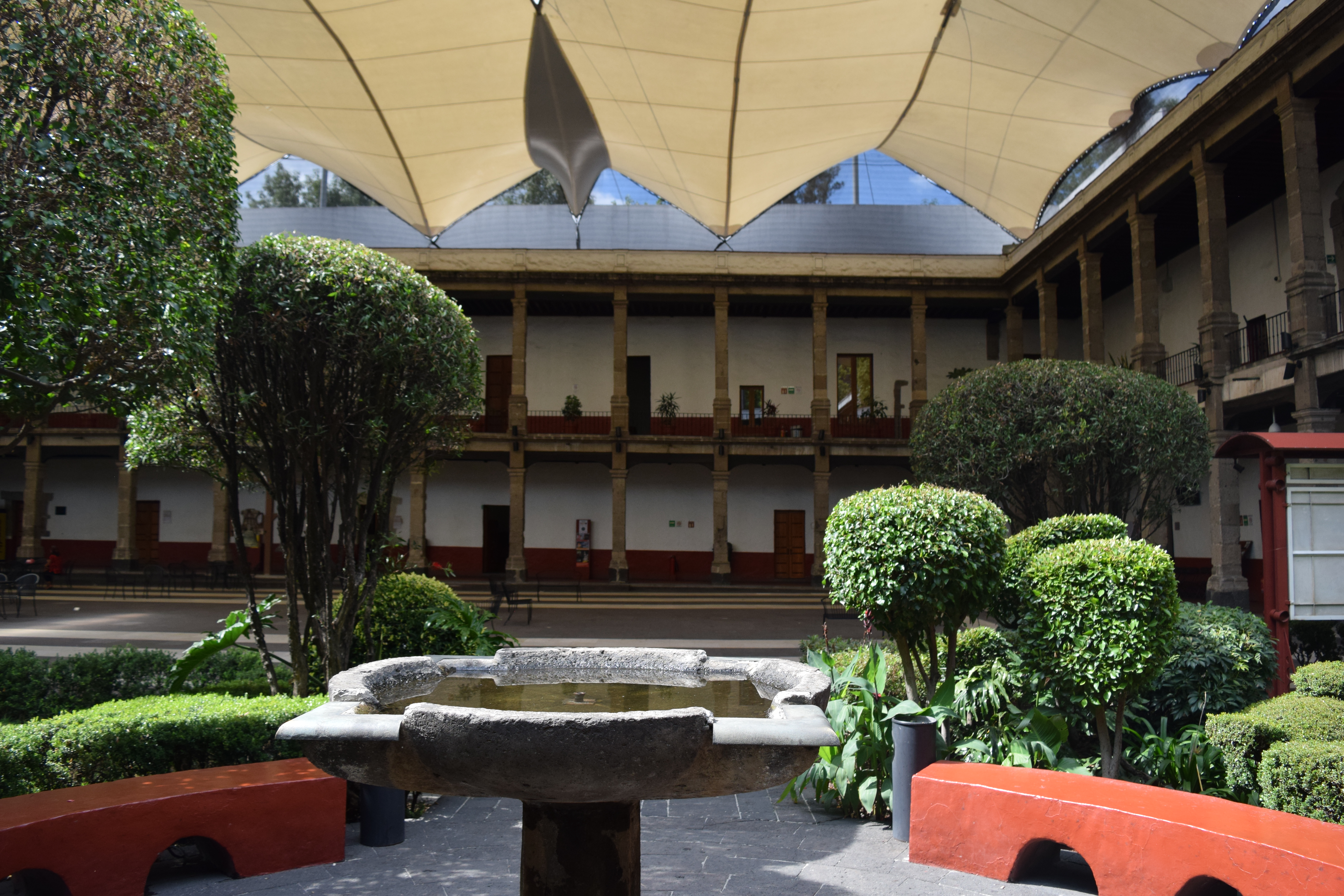
Inside the Hieronymite cloister where Sor Juana spent much of her life.

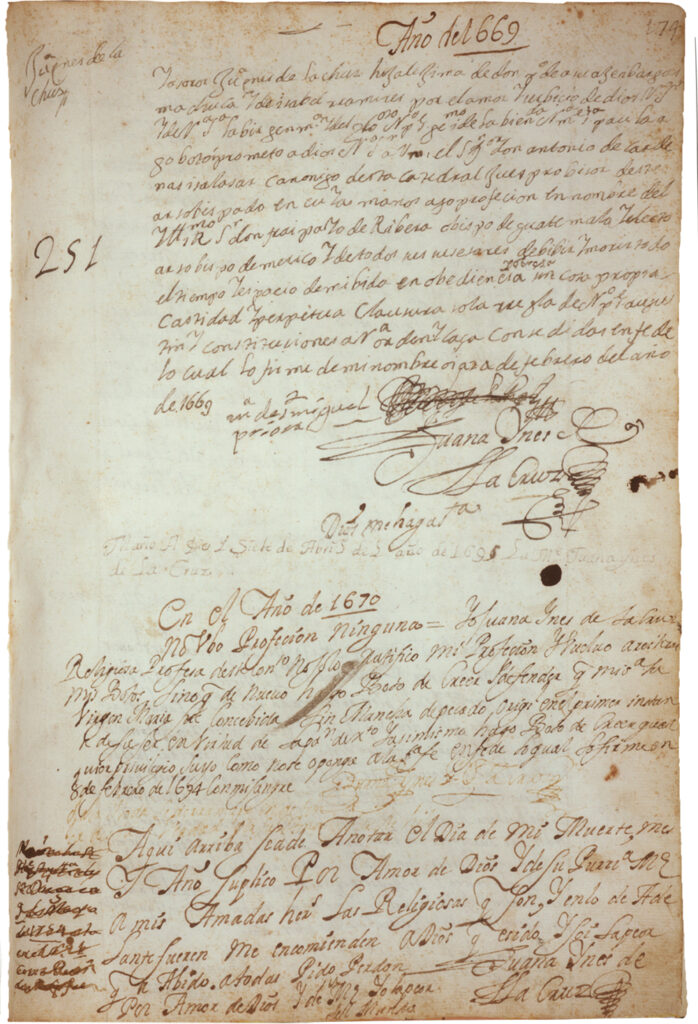
Manuscript page from Libro de professiones y elecciones de prioras y vicarias del Convento de San Gerónimo, 1586–1713, which Sor Juana signed in ink and her own blood.

In 1667, Inés entered the Monastery of St. Joseph, a community of the Discalced Carmelite nuns, as a postulant, where she remained but a few months. Later, in 1669, she entered the monastery of the Hieronymite nuns, which had more relaxed rules, where she changed her name to Sor Juana Inés de la Cruz, probably in reference to Sor Juana de la Cruz Vázquez Gutiérrez, a Spanish nun whose intellectual accomplishments earned her one of the few dispensations for women to preach the gospel. Another potential namesake was Saint Juan de la Cruz, one of the most accomplished authors of the Spanish Baroque. She chose to become a nun so that she could study as she wished since she wanted "to have no fixed occupation which might curtail my freedom to study."

In the convent and perhaps earlier, Sor Juana became intimate friends with Don Carlos de Sigüenza y Góngora, who visited her in the convent's locutorio. She stayed cloistered in the Convent of Santa Paula of the Hieronymite in Mexico City from 1669 until her death in 1695, and there she studied, wrote, and collected a large library of books. The Viceroy and Vicereine of New Spain became her patrons; they supported her and had her writings published in Spain. She addressed some of her poems to paintings of her friend and patron María Luisa Manrique de Lara y Gonzaga, daughter of Vespasiano Gonzaga, Duca di Guastala, Luzara e Rechiolo, and Inés María Manrique, 9th Countess de Paredes, whom she also addressed as Lísida.

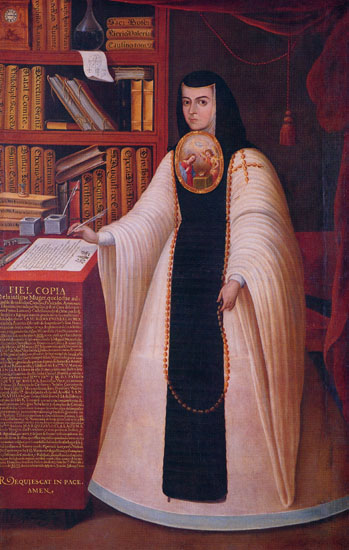
First known extant portrait of Sor Juana (c. 1713), by Juan de Miranda (c. 1667–1714). This is believed to be the second of two similar portraits, the first version (now lost) dated c. 1700.

In November 1690, the bishop of Puebla, Manuel Fernández de Santa Cruz published, under the pseudonym of Sor Filotea, and without her permission, Sor Juana's critique of a 40-year-old sermon by Father António Vieira, a Portuguese Jesuit preacher. In Carta Atenagórica, Sor Juana offered a scholastic refutation of Vieira's theology of divine love, arguing instead that Christ's greatest act of love was preserving human free will; many scholars also interpret the treatise as an implicit challenge to male intellectual authority within the Catholic Church. Sor Juana's original philosophical argument regarding God's finezas, where she argues that God's greatest act of love is negative as it refrains from granting favors so as not to burden humanity with un-payable debt, thereby preserving human's free will.

Along with Carta Atenagórica, the bishop also published his own letter in which he said she should focus on religious instead of secular studies. He published his criticisms to use them to his advantage against the priest, and while he agreed with her criticisms, he believed that as a woman, she should devote herself to prayer and give up her writings.

In response to her critics, Sor Juana wrote a letter, La Respuesta a Sor Filotea de la Cruz (Reply to Sister Philotea), in which she defended women's right to formal education. She also advocated for women's right to serve as intellectual authorities, not only through the act of writing, but also through the publication of their writing. By putting women, specifically older women, in positions of authority, Sor Juana argued, women could educate other women. Resultingly, Sor Juana argued, this practice could also avoid potentially dangerous situations involving male teachers in intimate settings with young female students. In 1691, she was reprimanded and ordered to stop writing after the exposure of a private letter in which she wrote of the right of women to education.

In addition to her status as a woman in a self-prescribed position of authority, Sor Juana's radical position made her an increasingly controversial figure. She famously remarked by quoting an Aragonese poet and echoing St. Teresa of Ávila: "One can perfectly well philosophize while cooking supper." In response, Francisco de Aguiar y Seijas, Archbishop of Mexico joined other high-ranking officials in condemning Sor Juana's "waywardness." In addition to opposition she received for challenging the patriarchal structure of the Catholic Church, Sor Juana was repeatedly criticized for believing that her writing could achieve the same philanthropic goals as community work.

By 1693, Sor Juana seemingly ceased writing to avoid risking official censure. Although there is no undisputed evidence of her renouncing her writing, there are documents showing her agreeing to undergo penance. Her name is affixed to such a document in 1694, but the tone of the supposed handwritten penitentials is in rhetorical and autocratic, in contrast to her normally lyrical style. One is signed "Yo, la Peor de Todas" ("I, the worst of all women"). She is said to have sold all her books, then an extensive library of more than 4,000 volumes, as well as her musical and scientific instruments. Other sources report that her defiance toward the Church led to the confiscation of all of her books and instruments, although the bishop himself agreed with the contents of her letters.

Of more than one hundred unpublished works, only a few of Sor Juana's writings have survived, which are known as the Complete Works. According to Octavio Paz, her writings were saved by the vicereine.

On 17 April 1695, Sor Juana died at the age of 46 after ministering to other nuns stricken during a plague. Sigüenza y Góngora delivered the eulogy at her funeral.

== Philosophy ==
Although frequently studied for her Baroque poetry and drama, Sor Juana engaged deeply with 17th-century epistemology, scholasticism, theology, and early modern feminist philosophy.

=== Epistemology and the limits of reason ===
In her philosophical poem Primero sueño (First Dream), Sor Juana investigates how the human mind acquires knowledge of the universe. The poem tests two philosophical methods:

- Intuitive comprehension: The soul first attempts to grasp all of creation at once through a single act of intuition, but is overwhelmed by the vastness of the cosmos.
- Discursive reason: The soul then shifts to Aristotelian logic, analyzing individual objects step by step using the ten categories of Aristotle.

When even this systematic method reaches its limit, Sor Juana concludes not that reason is worthless, but that human knowledge is finite—anticipating early modern epistemic humility and scientific skepticism.

=== Free will and theological critique ===
In the Carta Atenagórica (1690), Sor Juana critiques a famous sermon by the Portuguese Jesuit preacher António Vieira regarding what constitutes Christ's greatest act of love (fineza). While Vieira argued that Christ's greatest act was loving humanity without expecting return, Sor Juana drew on Augustine of Hippo, Thomas Aquinas, and John Chrysostom to argue that Christ's greatest act of love was withholding benefits so that human beings could exercise free will. Through this argument, she defended human rational autonomy as the highest divine gift.

=== Rational equality and empirical observation ===
Across her prose treatises Autodefensa Espiritual (1682) and La Respuesta a Sor Filotea de la Cruz (1691), Sor Juana constructs a philosophical defense of women's intellectual equality. Her argument rests on three main claims:

- Equality of the rational soul: Because women possess rational souls identical to those of men, denying women education violates both reason and divine justice.
- Interconnectedness of knowledge: Secular disciplines such as logic, physics, music, and geometry are necessary foundations for understanding theology.
- Everyday empiricism: Excluded from universities, women can practice natural philosophy through direct observation of daily life—such as studying geometry in a spinning top or chemical reactions while cooking.

== Works ==
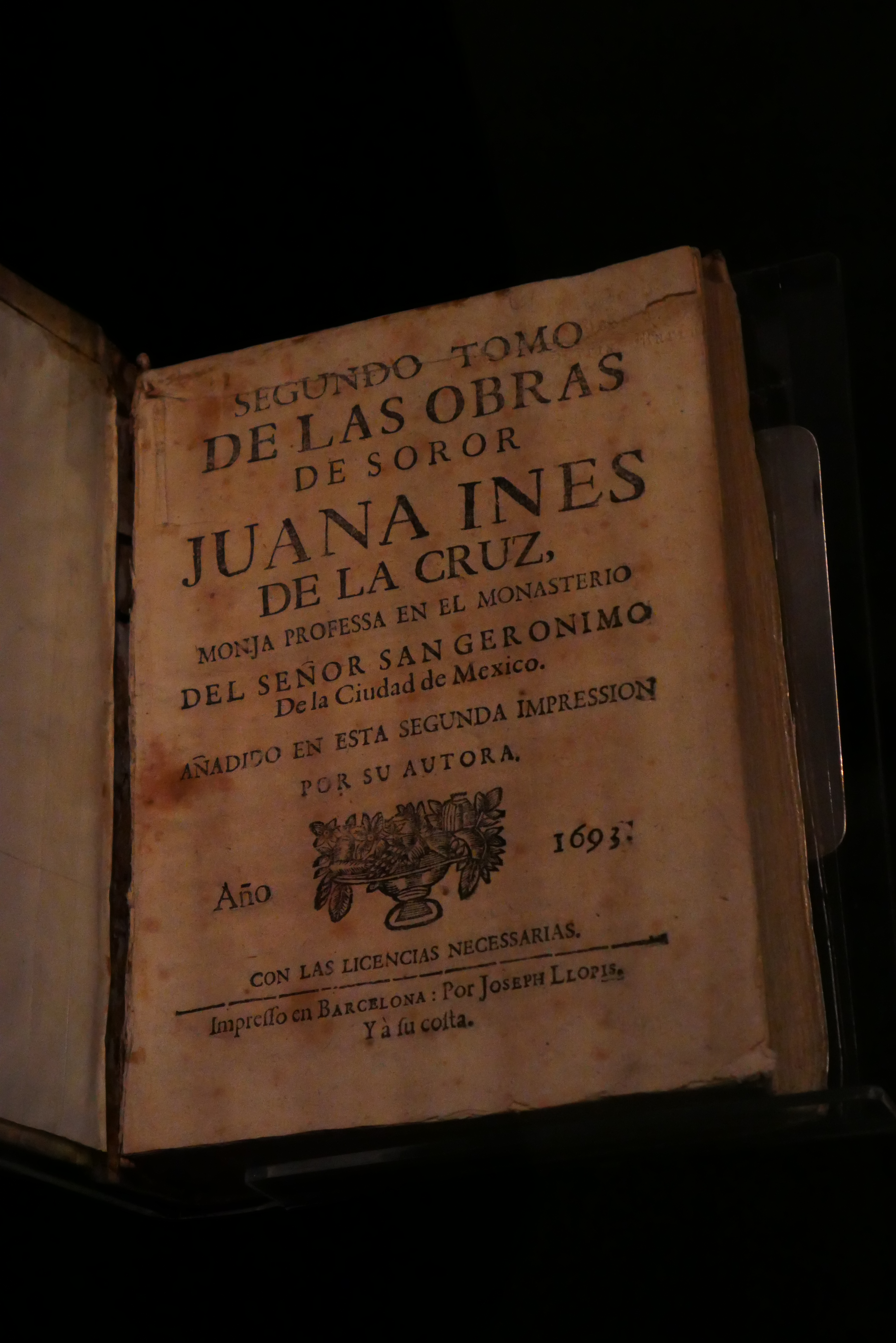
Libro de obras poéticas de Sor Juana Inés de la Cruz (1693) in the Museo Internacional del Barroco

=== Poetry ===
==== First Dream ====
First Dream, a long philosophical and descriptive silva (a poetic form combining verses of 7 and 11 syllables), deals with the shadow of night beneath which a person falls asleep in the midst of quietness and silence. There night and day animals participate, either dozing or sleeping, all urged to silence and rest by Harpocrates. The person's body ceases its ordinary operations, which are described in physiological and symbolical terms, ending with the activity of the imagination as an image-reflecting apparatus: the Pharos. From this moment, her soul, in a dream, sees itself free at the summit of her own intellect; in other words, at the apex of a pyramid-like mount, which aims at God and is luminous.

There, perched like an eagle, she contemplates the whole creation, but fails to comprehend such a sight in a single concept. Dazzled, the soul's intellect faces its own shipwreck, caused mainly by trying to understand the overwhelming abundance of the universe, until reason undertakes that enterprise, beginning with each individual creation, and processing them one by one, helped by the ten categories of Aristotle.

The soul cannot get beyond questioning herself about the traits and causes of a fountain and a flower, highlighting the limits of systematic scholastic inquiry when confronted with the full complexity of nature.. By that time, the body has consumed all its nourishment, and it starts to move and wake up, soul and body are reunited. The poem ends with the Sun overcoming Night in battle between luminous and dark armies, and with the poet's awakening.

==== Love poetry ====
Sor Juana's first volume of poetry, Inundación castálida, was published in Spain by the Vicereine Maria Luisa Manrique de Lara y Gonzága, Countess of Paredes, Marquise de la Laguna. Many of her poems dealt with the subject of love and sensuality. Colombian-American translator Jaime Manrique described her poetry thus: "her love poems are expressions of a complex and ambivalent modern psyche, and because they are so passionate and ferocious that when we read them we feel consumed by the naked intensity she achieves." One of Sor Juana's sonnets:

Soneto 173

Efectos muy penosos de amor, y que no por grandes se igualan con las prendas de quien le causa

¿Vesme, Alcino, que atada a la cadena
de Amor, paso en sus hierros aherrojada,
mísera esclavitud, desesperada
de libertad, y de consuelo ajena?

¿Ves de dolor y angustia el alma llena,
de tan fieros tormentos lastimada,
y entre las vivas llamas abrasada
juzgarse por indigna de su pena?

¿Vesme seguir sin alma un desatino
que yo misma condeno por extraño?
¿Vesme derramar sangre en el camino

siguiendo los vestigios de un engaño?
¿Muy admirado estás? Pues ves, Alcino:
más merece la causa de mi daño.

Sonnet 173 in Edith Grossman's 2014 translation

The very distressing effects of love, but no matter how great, they do not equal the qualities of the one who causes them

Do you see me, Alcino, here am I caught
in the chains of love, shackled in its irons,
a wretched slave despairing of her freedom,
and so far, so distant from consolation?

Do you see my soul filled with pain and anguish,
wounded by torments so savage, so fierce,
burned in the midst of living flames and judging
herself unworthy of her castigation?

Do you see me without a soul, pursuing
a folly I myself condemn as strange?
Do you see me bleeding along the way

as I follow the trail of an illusion?
Are you very surprised? See then, Alcino:
the cause of harm to me deserves much more.

=== "You Foolish Men (Philosophical Satire)" ===
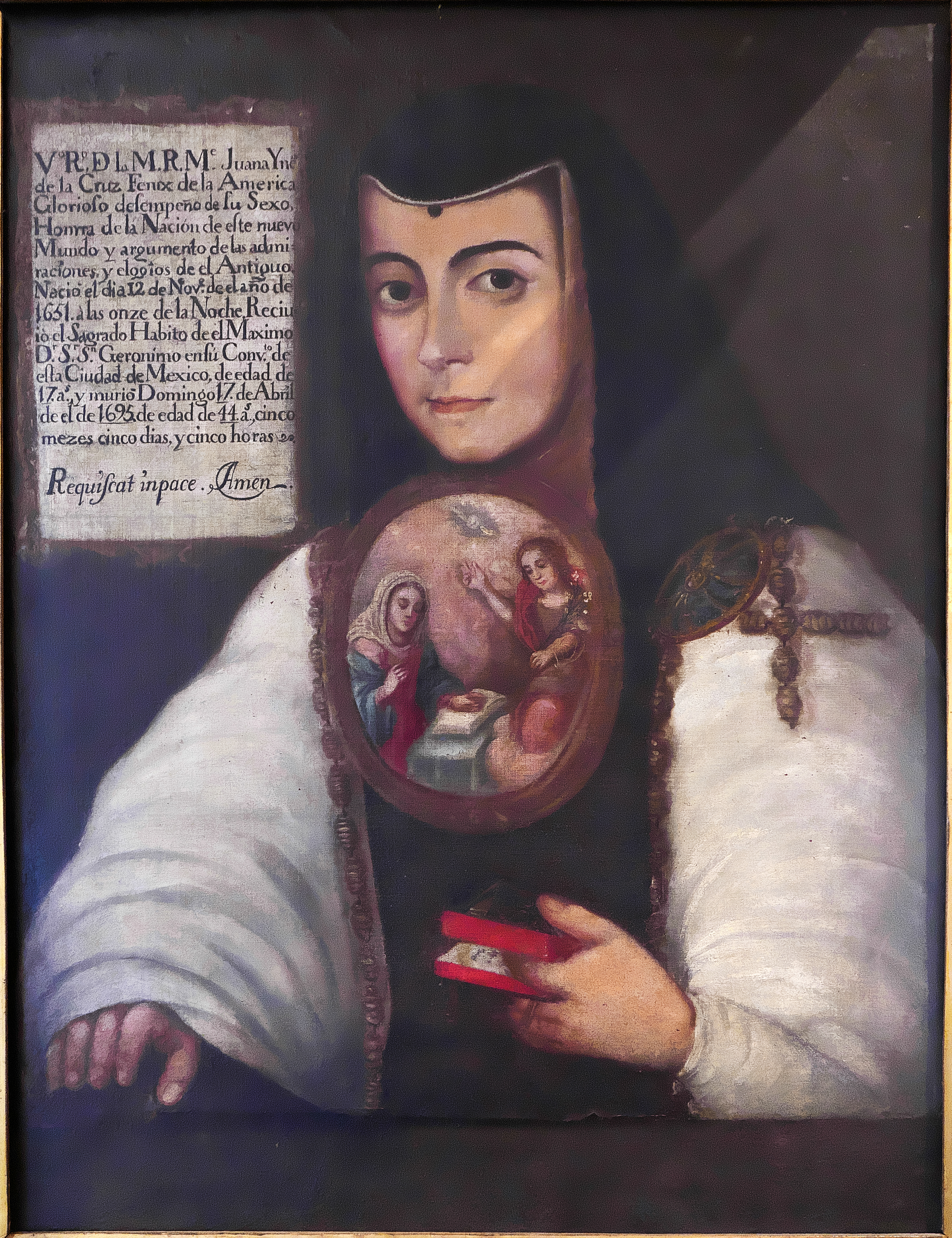
Convent of Santa Paula (Seville)

Sor Juana's Hombres Necios (Foolish men), written in the 1680s, is among the first proto-feminist literary works in the Americas to explore the double standards of men while also accusing men of trying to diminish a woman's honor. Society in seventeenth-century Mexico was heavily patriarchal, but Sor Juana nevertheless managed to publish this work, which only added to the backlash she would eventually face from the Church. Yet, driven by a passion for women's education, she was determined to challenge those who believed a woman's intellectual abilities were irrelevant.

Erin Elizabeth details how Sor Juana structured the poem to be centered on accusations of men that elevate the poem's meaning. Sor Juana emphasizes male irrationality, relating it to a man's ability to harm a woman by deeming her "impure," thus ruining her honor and reputation. She casts the blame on men, arguing that they are the root cause of their mistakes and create problems for women in order to avoid the consequences. Elizabeth argues that by examining impurity and the concept of "fall from grace", Hombres Necios explores the double standards men use on women, thus justifying the option for women to leave them in situations they cannot win. The names of Thais and Lucretia are cited along with the concept of prostitution to stress how men use women and leave them helpless, facing only blame and hatred.

Hombres Necios explored the idea of why women were frequently held guilty for the sins that men committed against them. Sor Juana's writing, in the Baroque literary style prevalent in her time, can be readily understood today. It is often seen as a proto-feminist love letter, and even in a "machista" Latin American society it has been popular among the population.

Hombres Necios, Satira Filosofica Poema 92
Hombres necios que acusáis

a la mujer sin razón,

sin ver que sois la ocasión

de lo mismo que culpáis:

si con ansia sin igual

solicitáis su desdén,

¿por qué queréis que obren bien

si las incitáis al mal?

Combatís su resistencia

y luego, con gravedad,

decís que fue livianidad

lo que hizo la diligencia.

Parecer quiere el denuedo

de vuestro parecer loco,

al niño que pone el coco

y luego le tiene miedo.

Queréis, con presunción necia,

hallar a la que buscáis,

para pretendida, Thais,

y en la posesión, Lucrecia.

¿Que humor puede ser más raro

que el que, falto de consejo,

él mismo empaña el espejo,

y siente que no esté claro?

Con el favor y el desdén

tenéis condición igual,

quejándoos, si os tratan mal,

burlándoos, si os quieren bien.

Opinión, ninguna gana;

pues la que más se recata,

si no os admite, es ingrata,

y si os admite, es liviana.

Siempre tan necios andáis

que, con desigual nivel,

a una culpáis por cruel

y a otra por fácil culpáis.

¿Pues cómo ha de estar templada

la que vuestro amor pretende,

si la que es ingrata, ofende,

y la que es fácil, enfada?

Mas, entre el enfado y pena

que vuestro gusto refiere,

bien haya la que no os quiere

y quejaos en hora buena.

Dan vuestras amantes penas

a sus libertades alas,

y después de hacerlas malas

las queréis hallar muy buenas.

¿Cuál mayor culpa ha tenido

en una pasión errada:

la que cae de rogada,

o el que ruega de caído?

¿O cuál es más de culpar,

aunque cualquiera mal haga:

la que peca por la paga,

o el que paga por pecar?

Pues ¿para qué os espantáis

de la culpa que tenéis?

Queredlas cual las hacéis

o hacedlas cual las buscáis.

Dejad de solicitar,

y después, con más razón,

acusaréis la afición

de la que os fuere a rogar.

Bien con muchas armas fundo

que lidia vuestra arrogancia,

pues en promesa e instancia

juntáis diablo, carne y mundo.

You Mulish Men, Philosophical Satire Poem 92

Translated by David Frye

You mulish men, accusing

woman without reason,

not seeing you occasion

the very wrong you blame:

since you, with craving unsurpassed,

have sought for their disdain,

why do you hope for their good works

when you urge them on to ill?

You assail all their resistance,

then, speaking seriously,

you say it was frivolity,

forgetting all your diligence.

What most resembles the bravery

of your mad opinion

is the boy who summons the bogeyman

and then cowers in fear of him.

You hope, with mulish presumption,

to find the one you seek:

for the one you court, a Thaïs;

but possessing her, Lucrecia.

Whose humor could be odd

than he who, lacking judgment,

himself fogs up the mirror,

then laments that it's not clear?

Of their favor and their disdain

you hold the same condition:

complaining if they treat you ill;

mocking them, if they love you well.

A fair opinion no woman can win,

no matter how discreet she is;

if she won't admit you, she is mean,

and if she does, she's frivolous.

You're always so stubbornly mulish

that, using your unbalanced scale,

you blame one woman for being cruel,

the other one, for being easy.

For how can she be temperate

when you are wooing after her,

if her being mean offends you

and her being easy maddens?

Yet between the anger and the grief

that your taste recounts,

blessed the woman who doesn't love you,

and go complain for all you're worth.

Your lover's grief gives

wings to their liberties,

yet after making them so bad

you hope to find them very good.

Whose blame should be the greater

in an ill-starred passion:

she who, begged-for, falls,

or he who, fallen, begs her?

Or who deserves more blame,

though both of them do ill:

she who sins for pay,

or he who pays for sin?

So why are you so afraid

of the blame that is your own?

Love them just as you have made them,

or make them as you seek to find.

Just stop your soliciting

and then, with all the more reason,

you may denounce the infatuation

of the woman who comes to beg for you.

With all these arms, then, I have proved

that what you wield is arrogance,

for in your promises and your demands

you join up devil, flesh, and world.

==== Dramas ====
In addition to the two comedies outlined here (House of Desires [Los empeños de una casa]) and Love is but a Labyrinth ([Amor es mas laberinto]), Sor Juana is cited as the author of a possible ending to the comedy by Agustin de Salazar: The Second Celestina (La Segunda Celestina). In the 1990s, Guillermo Schmidhuber found a release of the comedy that contained a different ending. He proposed that those one thousand words were written by Sor Juana. Some literary critics, such as Octavio Paz, Georgina Sabat-Rivers, and Luis Leal) have accepted Sor Juana as the co-author, but others, such as Antonio Alatorre and José Pascual Buxó, have questioned the attribution.

=== Comedies ===
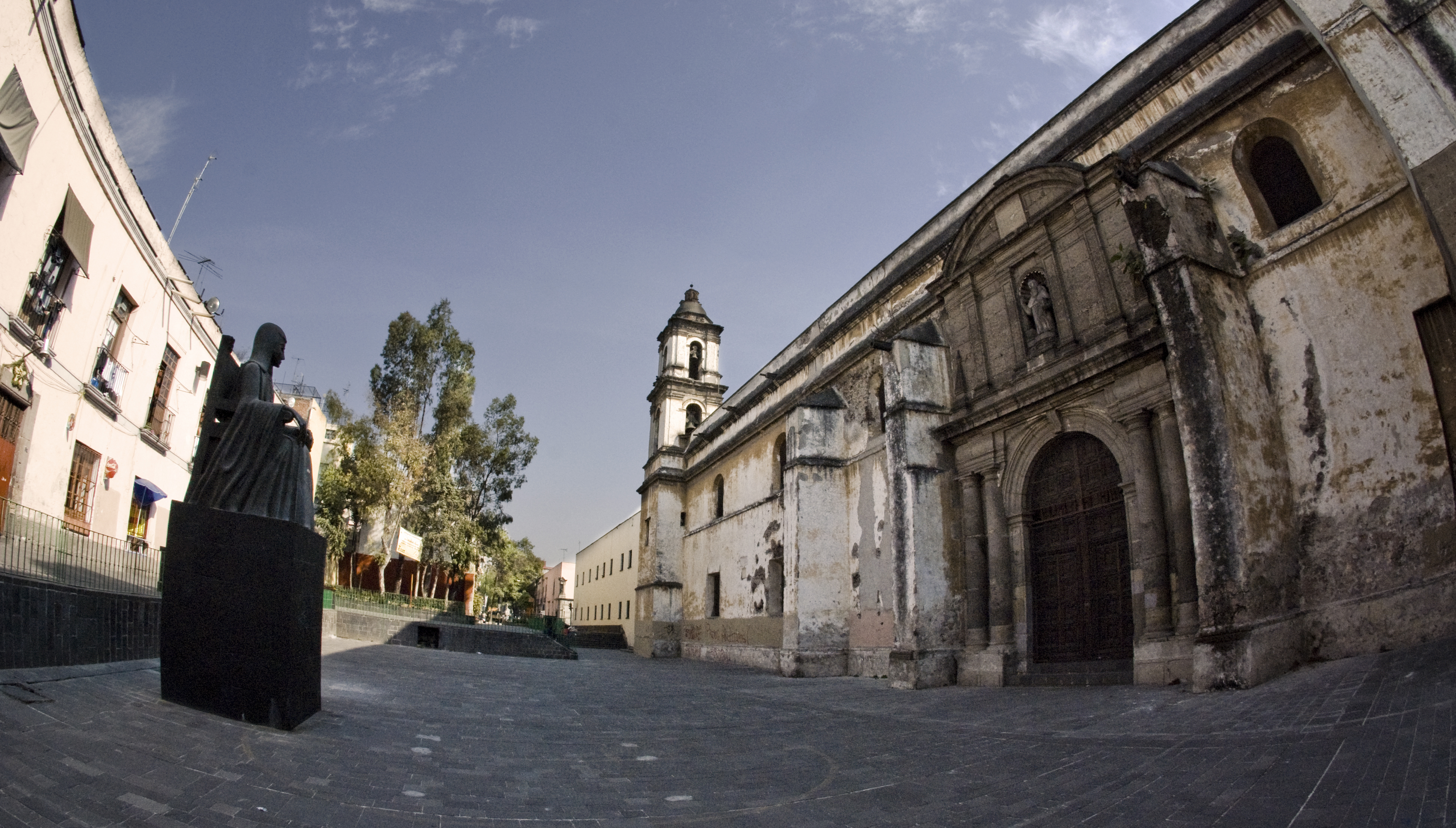
The former Convent of St Jerome in Mexico City.

Scholars have debated the meaning of Juana's comedies. Julie Greer Johnson describes how Juana protested against the rigorously defined relationship between genders through her full-length comedies and humor. She argues that Juana recognized the negative view of women in comedy which was designed to uphold male superiority at the expense of women. By recognizing the power of laughter, Juana appropriated the purpose of humor, and used it as a socially acceptable medium with which to question notions of men and women.

Pawns of a House

The work was first performed on October 4, 1683, during the celebration of the Viceroy Count of Paredes' first son's birth. Some critics maintain that it could have been set up for the Archbishop Francisco de Aguiar y Seijas' entrance to the capital, but this theory is not considered reliable.

The story revolves around two couples who are in love but, by chance of fate, cannot yet be together. This comedy of errors is considered one of the most prominent works of late baroque Spanish-American literature. One of its most peculiar characteristics is that the driving force in the story is a woman with a strong, decided personality who expresses her desires to a nun. The protagonist of the story, Dona Leonor, fits the archetype perfectly.

It is often considered the peak of Sor Juana's work and even the peak of all New-Hispanic literature. Pawns of a House is considered a rare work in colonial Spanish-American theater due to the management of intrigue, representation of the complicated system of marital relationships, and the changes in urban life.

Love is but a Labyrinth

The work premiered on February 11, 1689, during the celebration of the inauguration of the viceroyalty Gaspar de la Cerda y Mendoza. However, in his Essay on Psychology, Ezequiel A. Chavez mentions Fernandez del Castillo as a coauthor of this comedy.

The plot takes on the well-known theme in Greek mythology of Theseus: a hero from Crete Island. He fights against the Minotaur and awakens the love of Ariadne and Phaedra. Sor Juana conceived Theseus as the archetype of the baroque hero, a model also used by her fellow countryman Juan Ruiz de Alarcón. Theseus's triumph over the Minotaur does not make Theseus proud, but instead allows him to be humble.

=== Music ===
Besides poetry and philosophy, Sor Juana was interested in science, mathematics, and music. The latter is important, not only because musicality was an intrinsic part of the poetry of the time but also because she devoted a significant portion of her studies to the theory of instrumental tuning that, especially in the Baroque period, had reached critical importance. So involved was Sor Juana in the study of music that she wrote a treatise called El Caracol (now lost) that sought to simplify musical notation and solve the problems that Pythagorean tuning suffered from.

In the writings of Juana Inés, it is possible to detect the importance of sound. We can observe this in two ways. First, the analysis of music and the study of musical temperament appear in several of her poems. For instance, in the following poem, Sor Juana delves into the natural notes and the accidentals of musical notation:

Propiedad es de natura
que entre Dios y el hombre media,
y del cielo el be cuadrado
junto al be bemol de la tierra.
(Villancico 220)

Second, Professor Sarah Finley argues that the visual is related with patriarchal themes, while the sonorous offers an alternative to the feminine space in the work of Sor Juana. As an example of this, Finley points out that Narciso falls in love with a voice, and not with a reflection.

=== Other notable works ===
One musical work attributed to Sor Juana survives from the archive of Guatemala Cathedral. This is a 4-part villancico, Madre, la de los primores.

Other works include Hombres Necios (Foolish Men), and The Divine Narcissus.

Sor Juana Inés de la Cruz wrote a letter to her Confessor, Antonio Núñez de Miranda, titled Autodefensa Espiritual (Spiritual Self-Defense) in 1682, ten years before she severs ties after sending the Respuesta a Sor Filotea. However, unlike the Respuesta, the Autodefensa has much more biting and frank language used. In the Autodefensa, Sor Juana defends her intellectual pursuits and criticizes the restrictions placed on women's education and opportunities to pursue knowledge. She argues that women have the same rational souls as men and should be able to study and engage in intellectual pursuits. In the Autodefensa letter, Sor Juana uses this more forceful and confrontational language to reprimand and dismiss her Confessor. This has led scholars to suggest that the Autodefensa was a rehearsal for the arguments she would later make in the Respuesta. In both letters, Sor Juana defends her right to pursue knowledge and critiques the restrictions placed on women's intellectual development. Many of these themes were feminist in nature with one of the most notable being the right of women to be able to study intellectual pursuits. This theme is prevalent in the lines,

"But who has prohibited women private and individual studies? Do they not have a rational soul like men? Why should it then not enjoy within them the privilege of enlightenment in an education? Is it not as capable of earning God's glory and grace as yours? Why should it not be capable of such news and science, a trifle? What divine revelation, what determination of the Church, what dictate of reason made for us such a severe law?" (translated from Tapia Mendez 1993).

Sor Juana Inés de la Cruz's Autodefensa Espiritual and Respuesta a Sor Filotea are considered some of the most significant feminist writings of the 17th century. Her advocacy for women's intellectual rights was particularly groundbreaking, as women in her time were often restricted from pursuing academic and intellectual pursuits. Sor Juana's writings challenged patriarchal structures and called for greater gender equality and opportunities for women to pursue their passions. Sor Juana's writings were not only feminist but also expressed her thoughts on politics and religion. She was known for her strong defense of her beliefs and refusal to be silenced, which resulted in her being criticized by the Church and other powerful figures of her time. Despite facing backlash and opposition, Sor Juana continued to write and publish her works. Her work continues to inspire feminists and scholars today, and she is celebrated as a feminist icon and a leading voice in Latin American literature and intellectual thought. Sor Juana's writing also had a significant impact on the development of Mexican literature and culture, and she is considered a national treasure in Mexico.

== Translations and interpretations ==
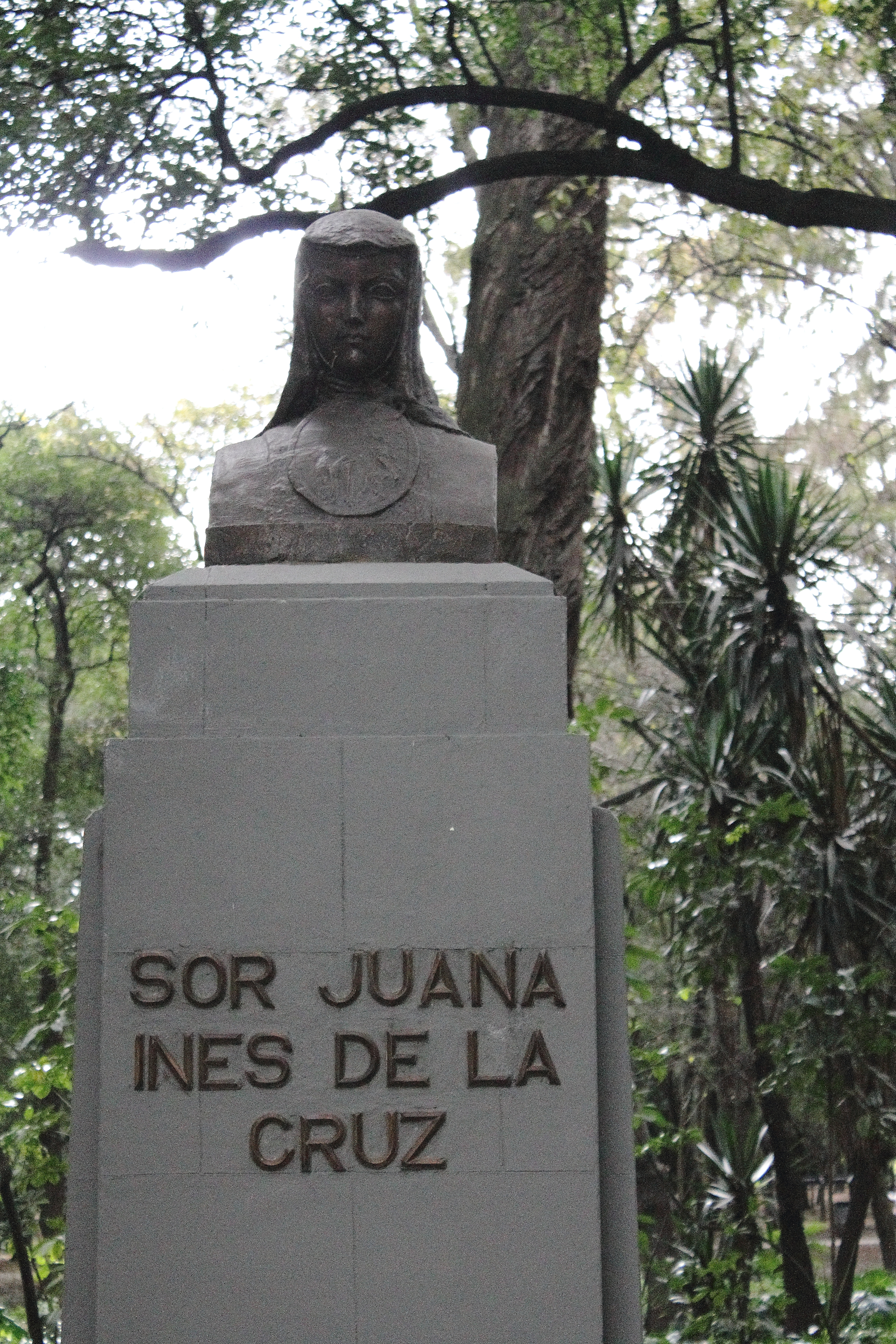
Monument of Sor Juana in Chapultepec.

Octavio Paz is credited with re-establishing the importance of the historic Sor Juana in modern times, and other scholars have been instrumental in translating Sor Juana's work to other languages. The only translations of Carta Atenagorica are found in Sor Juana Inés de la Cruz: Selected Writings by Pamela Kirk Rappaport and The Tenth Muse: Sor Juana Inés de la Cruz by Fanchon Royer. Translations of Sor Juana's La Respuesta are credited to Electa Arenal and Amanda Powell, Edith Grossman, Margaret Seyers Peden, and Alan S. Trubeblood. These translations are respectively found in The Answer/La Respuesta, Sor Juana Ines de la Cruz: Selected Works, A Woman of Genius: The Intellectual Biography of Sor Juana Inés de la Cruz and Poems, Protest, and a Dream, and A Sor Juana Anthology.

Since Sor Juana's works were rediscovered after her death, scholarly interpretations and translations are both abundant and contrasting.

=== Octavio Paz ===
Octavio Paz was a Mexican Nobel Prize laureate and scholar. In his 1982 book, Sor Juana Inés de la Cruz o las trampas de la fe (translated to English by Margaret Sayers Peden as Sor Juana: Or, The Traps of Faith), Paz examines and contemplates Sor Juana's poetry and life in the context of the history of New Spain, particularly focusing on the difficulties women then faced while trying to thrive in academic and artistic fields. Primarily, Paz aims to explain why Sor Juana chose to become a nun. In Juana Ramírez, Octavio Paz and Diane Marting find that Sor Juana's decision to become a nun stemmed from her refusal to marry; joining the convent, according to Paz and Marting, was a way for Juana to obtain authority and freedom without marrying.

In his analyses of Sor Juana's poetry, Octavio Paz traces some of her influences to the Spanish writers of the Golden Age and the Hermetic tradition, mainly derived from the works of a noted Jesuit scholar of her era, Athanasius Kircher. Paz interprets Sor Juana's most ambitious and extensive poem, Primero Sueño ("The First Dream"), as a representation of the desire of knowledge through a number of hermetic symbols, albeit transformed in her own language and skilled image-making abilities. In conclusion, Paz makes the case that Sor Juana's works were the most important body of poetic work produced in the Americas until the arrival of 19th-century figures such as Emily Dickinson and Walt Whitman.

=== Tarsicio Herrera Zapién ===
Tarsicio Herrera Zapién, a classical scholar, has also devoted much of his career to the study of Sor Juana's works. Some of his publications (in Spanish) include Buena fe y humanismo en Sor Juana: diálogos y ensayos: las obras latinas: los sorjuanistas recientes (1984); López Velarde y sor Juana, feministas opuestos: y cuatro ensayos sobre Horacio y Virgilio en México (1984); Poemas mexicanos universales: de Sor Juana a López Velarde (1989) and Tres siglos y cien vidas de Sor Juana (1995).

=== Feminist analyses and translations ===
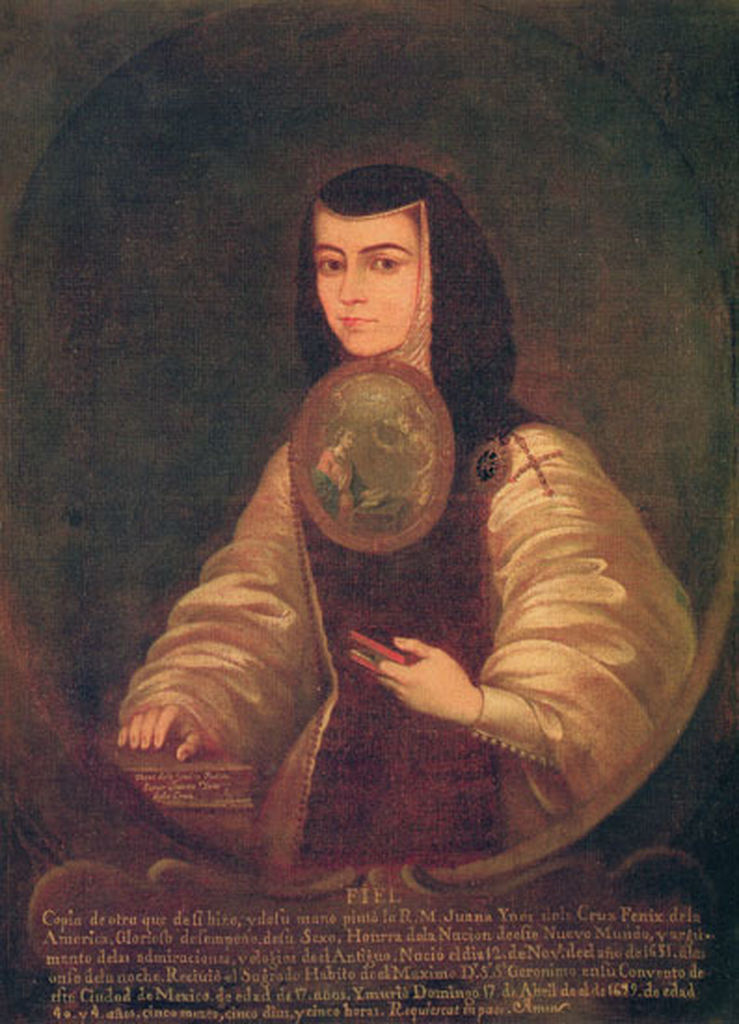
Sor Juana Inés de la Cruz by Friar Miguel de Herrera (1700-1789),

Scholars such as Scout Frewer argue that because Juana's advocacy for religious and intellectual authority would now be associated with feminism, she was a protofeminist. In the twenty-first century, Latin American philosophers and scholars generally interpret Sor Juana as a feminist before the time of feminism.

For instance, scholars like Rachel O'Donnell argue that Sor Juana occupied a special place in between socially acceptable and socially unacceptable roles in seventeenth century Mexico. By examining Sor Juana intersectionally, they prioritize the context of New Spain, specifically the influence of religion, race, and social norms, in understanding Sor Juana as a female theologian and poet.

According to O'Donnell, in colonial Mexico, education was an undertaking reserved for men, especially activities like writing and reading. Consequently, scholars like Octavio Paz argue, religion became a way for women to avoid marriage. Since Sor Juana was opposed to marriage, Paz argues, entering the convent was a socially acceptable way to be a single woman in seventeenth century Mexico. Entering the convent also meant that Sor Juana could read and write about religion despite the barriers to formal education for women. O'Donnell argues that Sor Juana was called a rare bird because although theology was only an acceptable pursuit for men in the Catholic Church, she actively studied religion. Sor Juana likely perceived wisdom and religion as inseparable, so she probably also believed that to follow God was to pursue wisdom. A third perspective suggests that considering the colonial context of New Spain and Sor Juana's background as a criolla, she represented colonial knowledge in a way that defied colonial religious structures.

Luis Felipe Fabre criticized 'Sorjuanista' scholarship as a whole, arguing that the discourse is binary rather than complex and multilayered.

==== Luis Felipe Fabre ====
Luis Felipe Fabre, a Mexican writer and scholar, ridicules other scholars, whom he collectively calls Sorjuanistas, who idolize Sor Juana. In his book, Sor Juana and Other Monsters, Fabre argues that the appropriation and recontextualization immanent in scholars' interpretations of Sor Juana construct Sor Juana as either a heretic or a lesbian. Fabre suggests that such representations constitute Sor Juana as a monstrosity or abnormality rather than as a complex woman. He suggests that rather than locating Sor Juana in a fixed identity, scholarship on Sor Juana should be a fluctuating and multilayered conversation.

==== Margaret Sayers Peden ====
Margaret Sayers Peden's 1982 A Woman of Genius: The Intellectual Autobiography of Sor Juana Ines de la Cruz, was the first English translation of Sor Juana's work. As well, Peden is credited for her 1989 translation of Sor Juana: Or, the Traps of Faith. Unlike other translations, Peden chose to translate the title of Sor Juana's best known work, First Dream, as "First I Dream" instead. Peden's use of first person instills authority in Sor Juana as an author, as a person with knowledge, in a male-dominated society. Peden also published her English translations of Sor Juana's work in an anthology called Poems, Protest, and a Dream. This work includes her response to authorities censuring her, La Respuesta, and First Dream.

==== Electa Arenal and Amanda Powell ====
An equally valuable feminist analysis and interpretation of Sor Juana's life and work is found in The Answer/La Respuesta by Sor Juana Inés de la Cruz by Electa Arenal, a Sor Juana scholar who is recognized among feminists who changed America, and Amanda Powell, a poet and translator. The original publication, released in 1994 by The Feminist Press, was re-released in an updated second edition in 2009, also by The Feminist Press. The bilingual publication includes poems, an annotated publication of Sor Juana's response to Church officials and her impassioned plea for education of women, analysis and a bibliography. The Answer applies a valuable gender lens to Sor Juana's writings and life. In their feminist analysis, Powell and Arenal translate the viewpoint of Sor Juana's writing as gender-ambiguous. Released in an updated second edition in 2009, also by The Feminist Press, the bilingual publication includes poems, an annotated publication of Sor Juana's response to Church officials and her impassioned plea for education of women, analysis and a bibliography.

==== Theresa A. Yugar ====
Theresa A. Yugar, a feminist theologian scholar in her own right, wrote her Master's and Doctoral theses on Sor Juana. Her book, Sor Juana Inés de la Cruz: Feminist Reconstruction of Biography and Text, discusses the life of Sor Juana through a feminist lens and analysis of her texts, La Respuesta (The Answer) and El Primero Sueño (First Dream).

Yugar aims to understand why individuals in Mexico in the twenty-first century have more knowledge of Frida Kahlo than Sor Juana. She celebrates poet Octavio Paz for crossing national borders with his internationally acclaimed work on Sor Juana: Or, The Traps of Faith. However, while Paz establishes Sor Juana's historical relevance, Yugar expands on his work to establish Sor Juana's importance in the twenty-first century.

Yugar argues that Sor Juana is the first female bibliophile in the New World. She also argues that Sor Juana's historic focus on gender and class equality in education (the public sphere) and the household (the private sphere), in addition to her advocacy for language rights, and the connection between indigenous religious traditions and ecological protection were paramount in the seventeenth century. Today's similar advocacy ignores her primal position in that work which is currently exclusively associated with ecofeminism and feminist theology.

== Historical influence ==
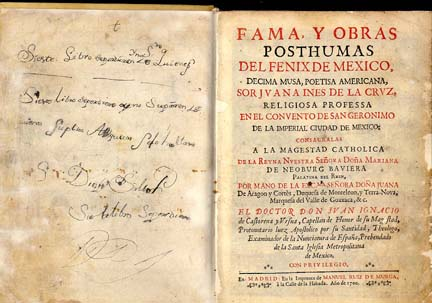
The first part of Sor Juana's complete works, Madrid, 1689.

=== Philanthropy ===
The Sor Juana Inés Services for Abused Women was established in 1993 to pay Sor Juana's dedication to helping women survivors of domestic violence forward. Renamed the Community Overcoming Relationship Abuse (CORA), the organization offers community, legal, and family support services in Spanish to Latin American women and children who have faced or are facing domestic violence.

=== Education ===
The San Jerónimo Convent, where Juana lived the last 27 years of her life and where she wrote most of her work is today the University of the Cloister of Sor Juana in the historic center of Mexico City. The Mexican government founded in the university in 1979.

=== Political controversy ===
While Sor Juana was a famous and controversial figure in the seventeenth century, she is also an important figure in modern times.

During renovations at the cloister in the 1970s, bones believed to be those of Sor Juana were discovered. A medallion similar to the one depicted in portraits of Juana was also found, with Margarita López Portillo, the sister of President José López Portillo (1976–1982), taking possession of the relic. During the tercentennial of Sor Juana's death in 1995, a member of the Mexican congress called on Margarita López Portillo to return the medallion. Portillo returned the medallion to Congress on November 14, 1995, with the event and description of the controversy reported in The New York Times a month later. Whether or not the medallion actually belonged to Juana, the incident sparked discussions about Juana and the abuse of official power in Mexico.

=== Contribution to feminism ===
==== Historic feminist movements ====
Amanda Powell locates Sor Juana as a contributor to the Querelles des Femmes, a three-century long literary debate about women. Central to this early feminist debate were ideas about gender and sex, and, consequently, misogyny.

Powell argues that the formal and informal networks and pro-feminist ideas of the Querelles des Femmes were important influences on Sor Juana's work, La Respuesta. For women, Powell argues, engaging in conversation with other women was as significant as communicating through writing. However, while Teresa of Ávila appears in Sor Juana's La Respuesta, Sor Juana makes no mention of the person who launched the debate, Christine de Pizan. Rather than focusing on Sor Juana's engagement with other literary works, Powell prioritizes Sor Juana's position of authority in her own literary discourse. This authoritative stance not only demonstrates a direct counter to misogyny, but was also typically reserved for men. As well, Sor Juana's argument that ideas about women in religious hierarchies are culturally constructed, not divine, echoes ideas about the construction of gender and sex.

==== Modern feminist movements ====
Yugar connects Sor Juana to feminist advocacy movements in the twenty-first century, such as religious feminism, ecofeminism, and the feminist movement in general.

Although the current religious feminist movement grew out of the Liberation Theology movement of the 1970s, Yugar uses Sor Juana's criticism of religious law that permits only men to occupy leadership positions within the Church as early evidence of her religious feminism. Based on Sor Juana's critique of the oppressive and patriarchal structures of the Church of her day, Yugar argues that Sor Juana predated current movements, like Latina Feminist Theology, that privilege Latina women's views on religion. She also cites modern movements such as the Roman Catholic Women Priest Movement, the Women's Ordination Conference, and the Women's Alliance for Theology, Ethics and Ritual, all of which also speak out against the patriarchal limitations on women in religious institutions.

Yugar emphasizes that Sor Juana interpreted the Bible as expressing concern with people of all backgrounds as well as with the earth. Most significantly, Yugar argues, Sor Juana expressed concern about the consequences of capitalistic Spanish domination over the earth. These ideas, Yugar points out, are commonly associated with modern feminist movements concerned with decolonization and the protection of the planet.

=== A symbol ===
==== Colonial and indigenous identities ====
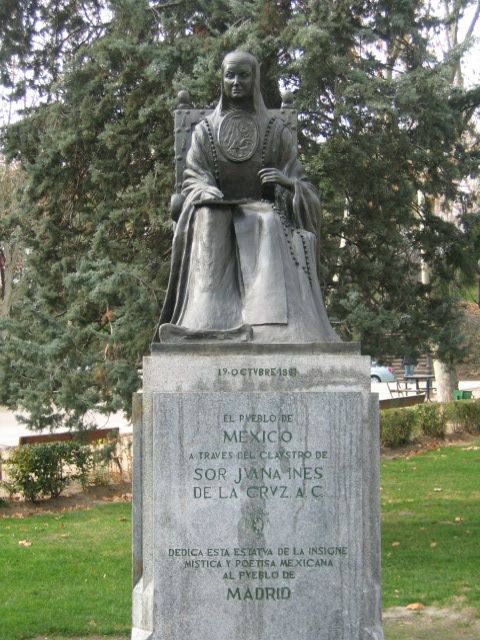
Statue of Sor Juana Inés in Madrid, Spain.

As a woman in religion, Sor Juana has become associated with the Virgin of Guadalupe, a religious symbol of Mexican identity, but was also connected to Aztec goddesses. For example, parts of Sor Juana's Villancico 224 are written in Nahuatl, while others are written in Spanish. The Virgin of Guadalupe is the subject of the Villancico, but depending on the language, the poem refers to both the Virgin of Guadalupe and Cihuacoatl, an indigenous goddess. It is ambiguous whether Sor Juana prioritizes the Mexican or indigenous religious figure, or whether her focus is on harmonizing the two.

Sor Juana's connection to indigenous religious figures is also prominent in her Loa to Divine Narcissus (Spanish "El Divino Narciso") (see Jauregui 2003, 2009). The play centers on the interaction between two Indigenous people, named Occident and America, and two Spanish people, named Religion and Zeal. The characters exchange their religious perspectives, and conclude that there are more similarities between their religious traditions than there are differences. The loa references Aztec rituals and gods, including Huitzilopochtli, who symbolized the land of Mexico.

Scholars like Nicole Gomez argue that Sor Juana's fusion of Spanish and Aztec religious traditions in her Loa to Divine Narcissus aims to raise the status of indigenous religious traditions to that of Catholicism in New Spain. Gomez argues that Sor Juana also emphasizes the violence with which Spanish religious traditions dominated indigenous ones. Ultimately, Gomez argues that Sor Juana's use of both colonial and indigenous languages, symbols, and religious traditions not only gives voice to indigenous peoples, who were marginalized, but also affirms her own indigenous identity.

Through their scholarly interpretations of Sor Juana's work, Octavio Paz and Alicia Gaspar de Alba have also incorporated Sor Juana into discourses about Mexican identity. Paz's accredited scholarship on Sor Juana elevated her to a national symbol as a Mexican traditional woman, writer, and religious authority. On the contrary, Gaspar de Alba emphasized Sor Juana's Mexican indigenous identity by inserting her into Chicana discourses.

==== Connection to Frida Kahlo ====
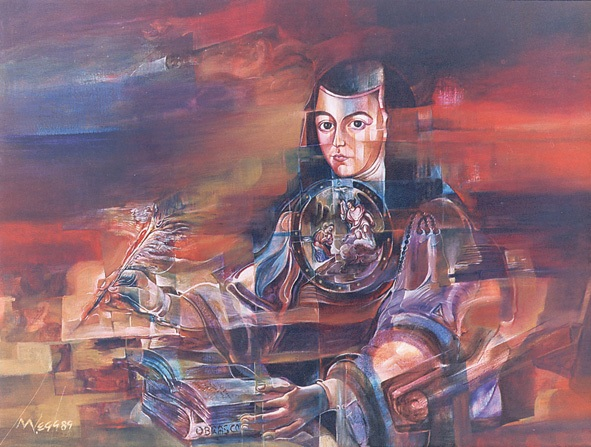
Juana Ines de la Cruz in art by Mexican artist Mauricio García Vega.

Paul Allatson emphasizes that women like Sor Juana and Frida Kahlo masculinized their appearances to symbolically complicate the space marked for women in society. Sor Juana's decision to cut her hair as punishment for mistakes she made during learning signified her own autonomy, but was also a way to engage in the masculinity expected of male-dominated spaces, like universities. According to Paul Allatson, nuns were also required to cut their hair after entering the convent. These ideas, Allatson suggests, are echoed in Frida Kahlo's 1940 self-portrait titled Self-Portrait with Cropped Hair, or Autorretrato con el pelo corto.

As well, the University of the Cloister of Sor Juana honored both Frida Kahlo and Sor Juana on October 31, 2018, with a symbolic altar. The altar, called Las Dos Juanas, was specially made for the Day of the Dead.

==== Official recognition by the Mexican government ====
In present times, Sor Juana is still an important figure in Mexico.

In 1995, Sor Juana's name was inscribed in gold on the wall of honor in the Mexican Congress in April 1995. Sor Juana also appears on the Mexican currency obverse. She was first included on the 1000 pesos AA family bill in 1978, which was in circulation until 1992. Between 1994 and 2020, she appeared on the 200 pesos C, D, D1, and F family bills. She currently appears on the 100 pesos G bill, which has been in circulation since 2020. The town where Sor Juana grew up, San Miguel Nepantla in the municipality of Tepetlixpa, State of Mexico, was renamed in her honor as Nepantla de Sor Juana Inés de la Cruz.

== Veneration ==
In 2022, the Episcopal Church of the United States gave final approval and added her feast to the liturgical calendar. Her feast day is April 18.

== Bibliography ==
- 1676 – Villancicos, que se cantaron en la Santa Iglesia Metropolitana de Mexico. En los maitines de la Purissima Concepción de Nuestra Señora
- 1689 – Inundación castalida. Madrid: Juan Garcia Infanson
- 1693 – Segundo tomo de las obras de sor Juana Inés de la Cruz, monja professa en el monasterio del Señor San Geronimo de la ciudad de Mexico. Barcelona: Joseph Llopis
- 1701 – Fama, y obras posthumas, tomo tercero, del fenix de México, y dezima musa, poetisa de la America, Sor Juana Inés de la Cruz, religiosa professa en el Convento de San Geronimo, de la imperial ciudad de Mexico. Barcelona: Rafael Figuerò
- 1709 – Poemas de la unica poetisa americana, musa dezima, soror Juana Inés de la Cruz, religiosa professa en el monasterio de San Germonimo de la imperial ciudad de Mexico. Valencia: Antonio Bordazar

== Popular culture ==
=== Literature ===
- American poet Diane Ackerman wrote a verse drama, Reverse Thunder, about Sor Juana (1992).
- Canadian poet and novelist Margaret Atwood's 2007 book of poems The Door includes the poem "Sor Juana Works in the Garden".
- Puerto Rican poet Giannina Braschi wrote the postmodern Spanglish novel Yo-Yo Boing! in which characters debate the greatest women poets, acknowledging both Sor Juana and Emily Dickinson.
- Canadian novelist Paul Anderson devoted 12 years writing the 1300-page novel Hunger's Brides (2004) on Sor Juana. His novel won the 2005 Alberta Book Award.
- A fictionalized Sor Juana appears in the 2007 novel Sor Juana's Second Dream by Alicia Gaspar de Alba.

=== Music ===
- American composer John Adams and director Peter Sellars used two of Sor Juana's poems, Pues mi Dios ha nacido a penar and Pues está tiritando in their libretto for the Nativity oratorio-opera El Niño (2000).
- Composer Allison Sniffin's original composition, Óyeme con los ojos – (Hear Me with Your Eyes: Sor Juana on the Nature of Love), based on text and poetry by Sor Juana, was commissioned by Melodia Women's Choir, which premiered the work at the Kaufman Center in New York City.
- Composer Daniel Crozier and librettist Peter M. Krask wrote With Blood, With Ink, an opera based around her life, while both were students at Baltimore's Peabody Institute in 1993. The work won first prize in the National Operatic and Dramatic Association's Chamber Opera Competition. In 2000, excerpts were included in the New York City Opera's Showcasing American Composers Series. The work in its entirety was premiered by the Fort Worth Opera on April 20, 2014, and recorded by Albany Records.
- Puerto Rican singer iLe recites part of one of Sor Juana's sonnets in her song "Rescatarme".
- Brazilian composer Jorge Antunes recorded the 2013 electroacoustic musical work CARTA ATHENAGÓRICA with the support of Ibermúsicas. The composition honors Sor Juana with musical structure and musical objects based on rhetoric and figures of speech, using the chiasmus, also called retruécano, from Sor Juana's poems.

=== Video ===
- Mexican actress Andrea Palma portrayed her in the 1935 biopic Sor Juana Inés de la Cruz.
- Spanish actress Amparo Rivelles portrayed her in the 1962 telenovela series Sor Juana Inés de la Cruz.
- Spanish actress Assumpta Serna portrayed her in the 1990 film I, the Worst of All (Yo, la peor de todas), written and directed by María Luisa Bemberg, based on the 1982 Octavio Paz book.
- Mexican actress Arcelia Ramírez portrayed her in the 2016 miniseries Juana Inés, coproduced by Canal Once for Netflix.

=== Theater ===
- Helen Edmundson's play The Heresy of Love, based on the life of Sor Juana, was premiered by the Royal Shakespeare Company in early 2012 and revived by Shakespeare's Globe in 2015.
- Jesusa Rodríguez has produced a number of works concerning Sor Juana, including Sor Juana en Almoloya and Striptease de Sor Juana, based on Juana's poem "Primero Sueño".
- Playwright, director, and producer Kenneth Prestininzi wrote Impure Thoughts (Without Apology), which follows Sor Juana's experience with Bishop Francisco Aguilar y Seijas.
- Tanya Saracho's play The Tenth Muse, a fictionalized 18th-century drama about women in a convent in Colonial Mexico included seven female characters and their discovery of and relationship to Sor Juana's writings, debuted at the Oregon Shakespeare Festival.

== Sources ==
- The Juana Inés de la Cruz Project Dartmouth College. Retrieved: 2010-05-09.
- Sor Juana Ines de la Cruz (1648–1695) Oregon State University. Retrieved: 2010-05-09.
- Universidad del Claustro de Sor Juana. Retrieved: 2010-08-03.
