= Silva (poetry) =

Spanish poetic stanza consisting of 11- and 7-syllable lines

In Spanish poetry, a silva is a poetic form consisting of in eleven- and seven- syllable lines: hendecasyllables (endecasílabos) and heptasyllables (heptasílabos), the majority of which are rhymed. Although, there is no fixed order or rhyme, nor is there a fixed number of lines. Silvas are used by persons of high rank, usually in soliloquies, and for highly emotional narration and description.

The use of the silva can be found in Luis de Góngora's Soledades and in Sor Juana Inés de la Cruz's First Dream.
