= Vespasiano Vincenzo Gonzaga =

Italian noble and Viceroy of Valencia

Vespasiano Vincenzo Gonzaga (1621–1687) was an Italian noble, by birth member of the House of Gonzaga and later Viceroy of Valencia.

== Early life ==
He was the second son of Cesare II Gonzaga, Duke of Guastalla and his wife, Dona Isabella Orsini (1598–1623).

== Marriage ==
He married in 1646 in Spain with María Inés Manrique de Lara, 10th Countess of Paredes de Nava (d. 1679).

They had five children:

- María Luisa Manrique de Lara y Gonzaga (1649–1721), 11th Countess of Paredes de Nava; married Tomás de la Cerda, 3rd Marquess of la Laguna, Viceroy of New Spain (1680–1686)
- Josef de Lara y Gonzaga (1683–1727)
- Maria Josefa Manrique de Lara y Gonzaga; married Don Antonio Caspar Pimentel Banoso de Ribera, 4th Marquesa de Malpica
- Isabella Manrique de Lara y Gonzaga; died young
- Diego Manrique de Lara y Gonzaga; died young

He was viceroy of Valencia between 1669 and 1675.
