= María Luisa Manrique de Lara y Gonzaga =

Mexican politician

The Most Excellent Lady María Luisa Manrique de Lara y Gonzaga
- Marchioness of la Laguna de Camero Viejo; 11th Countess of Paredes de Nava
- Born: 17 April 1649; Paredes de Nava, Crown of Castille
- Died: 4 September 1721 (aged 72); Bergamo, Republic of Venice
- Noble family: House of Gonzaga (by birth); House of la Cerda (by marriage)
- Spouse: Tomás de la Cerda y Aragón
- Issue: José María de la Cerda y Manrique de Lara
- Father: Vespasiano Vincenzo Gonzaga
- Mother: María Inés Manrique de Lara y Manrique Enríquez

María Luisa Manrique de Lara y Gonzaga, Marchioness of la Laguna, 11th Countess of Paredes (April 17, 1649 – September 4, 1721) was by birth member of the House of Gonzaga and Vicereine of New Spain by virtue of marriage.

== Early life ==
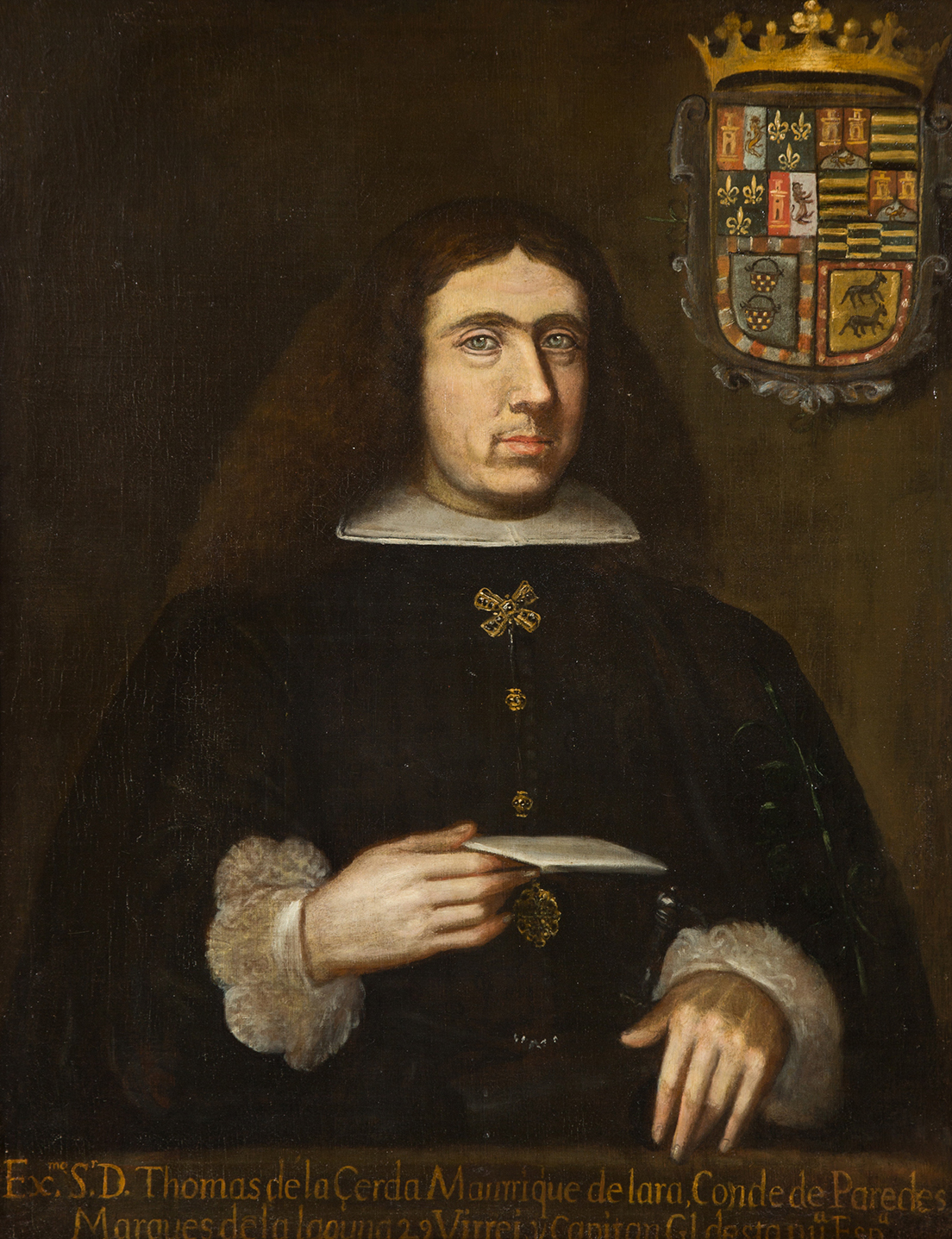
Portrait of Tomás de la Cerda, 3rd Marquis of la Laguna, Viceroy of Galicia and of New Spain (1638-1692) from 1680 to 1686, 17th century, Chapultepec Castle (National Museum of History)

She was born as the eldest daughter of Vespasiano Vincenzo Gonzaga (1621–1687), Viceroy of Valencia, and his wife, María Inés Manrique de Lara, 10th Countess of Paredes de Nava (d. 1679). Her siblings included Maria Josefa (b. 1660), future Marquesa de Malpica, Isabella and Diego who both died young.

== Biography ==
She married Tomás de la Cerda, 3rd Marquis of la Laguna de Camero Viejo, thus becoming vicereine of New Spain from 1680 to 1686.

In 1680, The Cabildo commissioned two triumphal arches for the arrival of the Marquises of la Laguna de Camero Viejo, the new Viceroys, to Mexico City. The first, displayed in Santo Domingo, was created by Carlos de Sigüenza y Góngora. The second, displayed in the Mexico City Cathedral, was the allegorical Neptune of Sor Juana Inés de la Cruz. Sor Juana compares the new Viceroy with Neptune and his wife, Maria Luisa, with Amphitrite, the goddess of the sea.

The only son of María Luisa, José María de la Cerda y Manrique de Lara was born on July 5, 1683, and Sor Juana also dedicated poems to the event. He was baptized on July 14, 1683, by the Archbishop Aguiar y Seijas in the Metropolitan Cathedral of Mexico City.

== Juana Inés de la Cruz ==
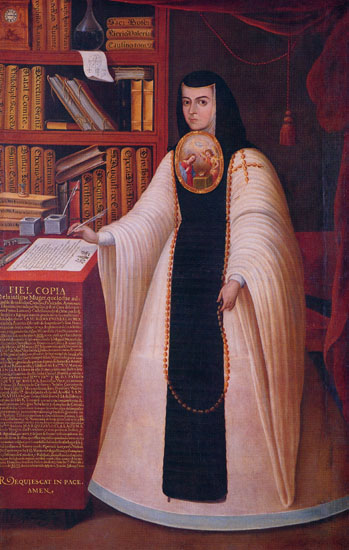
Portrait of Sor Juana Inés de la Cruz, XVIII century copy of canvas by Juan Carreño de Miranda, originally painted in 1680

She was the patron of Juana Inés de la Cruz and she supported the nun and had her works published in Spain

Sor Juana dedicated several poems to her. Just as Leonor Carreto was "Laura" in the poems that Sor Juana dedicated to her, Doña Maria Luisa was "Lysi". Octavio Paz dedicated a chapter of his book "Sor Juana Inés de la Cruz o Las trampas de la fe" (Sor Juana Ines de la Cruz or the traps of the faith) to the relationship between the virreina and the poet. Publisher Flores Raras published a compilation of poems that Sor Juana dedicated to the virreina entitled "Un amar ardiente" (An ardent love) edited by Sergio Téllez-Pon. Dona Maria Luisa also appears as a character in the movie "Yo, la peor de todas" (I, the worst of all) by Maria Luisa Bemberg and in the limited TV series "Juana Inés" aired on Canal Once.

Sor Juana presented her play "Los empeños de una casa" (The Pawns of a House) for Maria Luisa and her husband, as well as Archbishop Francisco de Aguiar y Seijas. In the work Sor Juana includes several verses in honor of Maria Luisa such as "Divina Lysi". Dona Maria Luisa published the book of poems of Sor Juana "Inundación Castálida" (Castálida Flood) in 1689 in Madrid. The second volume was published a few years later in Seville.

== Death ==
María Luisa Manrique de Lara y Gonzaga died on September 4, 1721, in Bergamo, Lombardy, Italy.

== In popular culture ==
Dona Maria Luisa is featured as a recurring character in the Spanish-language Canal Once television mini-series Juana Ines, from episodes 4 through 6.
