= Juana Inés =

2016 Mexican TV series

- Genre: Drama
- Created by: Patricia Arriaga Jordán
- Written by: Patricia Arriaga; Monika Revilla; Javier Peñalosa
- Directed by: Emilio Maillé; Patricia Arriaga; Julián de Tavira
- Starring: Arcelia Ramírez; Arantza Ruiz
- Theme music composer: Michael Nyman
- Country of origin: Mexico
- Original language: Spanish
- No. of seasons: 1
- No. of episodes: 7

Production
- Executive producer: Patricia Arriaga
- Producer: Gabriela Valentán
- Cinematography: Luis Ávila
- Camera setup: Multi-camera
- Production company: Bravo Films

Original release
- Network: Canal Once
- Release: March 26 – May 7, 2016

Related
- Sor Juana Inés de la Cruz

Juana Inés, is a Mexican television series co-produced by Canal Once and Bravo Films. The series is created by Patricia Arriaga Jordán, based on the life and work of Sor Juana Inés de la Cruz. The series consists of seven episodes and one season. Series production began on November 4, 2015 in the Ex-Hacienda Santa Mónica, in Mexico City. The series was released on 26 March 2016.

The series stars Arcelia Ramírez as Sor Juana Inés de la Cruz and Arantza Ruiz as Young Juana Inés.

== Plot ==
The story is based on the life of Sor Juana Inés de la Cruz as she travels from her uncle's home to the court of the viceroy of New Spain to a convent run by Carmelite Nuns. It shows Juana's struggles as she tries to find a safe haven in order to pursue her intellectual development as a woman with a damaging past. She faces harsh opposition from the leaders of the Catholic Church and the Spanish Inquisition who are horrified by Juana's intelligence and her desire for knowledge as a woman. The story tries to explain some of the mystery surrounding the life of Sor Juana Inés de la Cruz: her uncertain relationship with the church hierarchy, the nature of her affections, and the reason for her sudden, seemingly self-imposed silence.

== Context ==
Juana Inés is one of few fiction pieces based on the life of the iconic Mexican poet - and the only TV series. María Luisa Bemberg made a movie in 1990 called I, the Worst of All based on the book "The traps of faith" by Nobel Prize Winner Octavio Paz.

== Cast ==
- Arcelia Ramírez as Sor Juana Inés de la Cruz
- Arantza Ruiz as Young Juana Inés
- Hernán del Riego as Padre Antonio Núñez de Miranda
- Margarita Sanz as Sor María
- Lisa Owen as Vicereine Leonor Carreto de Toledo
- Yolanda Corrales as Vicereine María Luisa Manrique de Lara
- Carlos Valencia as Archbishop Francisco de Aguiar y Seijas
- Mauricio Isaac as Virrey Antonio Sebastián de Toledo y Salazar, Marqués de Mancera
- Pedro de Tavira Egurrola as Carlos de Sigüenza y Góngora
- Emilio Savinni as Virrey Tomás Antonio de la Cerda y Aragón, Marqués de la Laguna
- Néstor Galván as Obispo Manuel Fernández de Santa Cruz
- Paulina Matos as María Luisa de Toledo y Carreto
- Alberto Collado as Ignacio Lizárraga
- Rocío García as Josefa López
- Luis Maya as Padre Carlos
- Clementina Guadarrama as Malinalli

== Soundtrack ==
Juana Ines's last episode's end credits list the following songs as its soundtrack:

- String Quartet No. 1 (Michael Nyman) from "Chamber of Music Volume 2", played by the Balanescu Quartet. (Courtesy of MN Records, 2012)
  - Alexander Balanescu and Jonathan Carney playing the violin, Kate Musker playing the viola, and Anthony Hinningan playing the cello.
- String Quartet No. 2 (Michael Nyman) from "Chamber of Music Volume 2", played by the Balanescu Quartet. (Courtesy of MN Records, 2012)
  - Alexander Balanescu and Jonathan Carney playing the violin, Kate Musker playing the viola, and Anthony Hinningan playing the cello.
- Trysting Fields (Michael Nyman) from "Mozart 252", played by the Michael Nyman Band (Courtesy of MN Records, 2008)
  - Conducted by Michael Nyman.
- Gaudete Cum Maria (Eugenia Ramirez) in Suavidad Al Aire from "Cantatas y Arias Del Mexico Virreinal", played by Camerata Aguascalientes. (Courtesy of Quindecim Recordings)
  - Directed by Horacio Franco, with Eugenia Ramirez as a soprano.
- Amplius Lava Me (Eugenia Ramirez) in Suavidad Al Aire from "Cantatas y Arias Del Mexico Virreinal", played by Camerata Aguascalientes. (Courtesy of Quindecim Recordings)
  - Directed by Horacio Franco, with Eugenia Ramirez as a soprano.
- A La Misma Señora (Written by Sor Juana Ines de la Cruz in honor of the Countess of Galve's birthday)
  - Composed by Margarita Sanz, interpreted by Margarita Sanz and Arcelia Ramirez.

Another song has gone unlisted in the end credits. Quae Est Ista, in Suavidad Al Aire from "Cantatas y Arias Del Mexico Virreinal", is another song by Eugenia Ramirez that can clearly be heard during the triumphal arch scene in the fourth episode of the series. The reason as to why it is seemingly absent from the end credits is not known.

== Episodes ==
The series was acquired by Netflix, was released on January 27, 2017 in France.

No.	Title	Directed by	Written by	Original release date
1	"Miradme al menos" "At Least Look Unto Me"	Patricia Arriaga-Jordán	Patricia Arriaga-Jordán	March 26, 2016
Juana Inés is thrown out of her uncle's house and sent to the viceroyal court to try her luck. At the age of 16, she obtains the support of the Viceroy Marquis of Mancera, but also the obsessive love of the Vicereine Leonor Carreto. To be the tutor of the daughter of the viceroys, the young woman is subjected to a public examination before 40 of the most brilliant minds of Mexico City, ending in praise from the examiners for her lucidity and erudition. Father Antonio Núñez de Miranda, confessor of the viceroys, is shown up by Juana Inés publicly and in revenge, orders an investigation into her background.
2	"Para el alma no hay encierro" "There Is No Confinement for the Soul"	Patricia Arriaga-Jordán & Emilio Maillé	Patricia Arriaga-Jordán & Monika Revilla	April 2, 2016
Father Núñez discovers that Juana Inés has lied by saying that she is a legitimate daughter in order to enter the court as a lady-in-waiting to the vicereine, a situation that puts her at grave risk. Juana Inés rejects a noble's wedding proposal because of her illegitimate background. After being asked for guidance by Juana Inés on the issue of her future as an illegitimate daughter, he suggests Juana Inés enter the order of the Discalced Carmelites. Juana Inés unknowingly follows Núñez's plan to reduce her to a cloistered nun, though she rebels against a life of sacrifice and blind obedience.
3	"Lágrimas negras de mi pluma" "Black Tears from My Pen"	Emilio Maillé	Patricia Arriaga-Jordán & Monika Revilla	April 9, 2016
The viceroy is disconsolate. Juana Inés regains her health, while Núñez rebukes her departure from the convent of the Carmelites and cheats her to return. Desperate, Juana Ines asks the prioress to enter the order of San Jerónimo and Núñez convinces Pedro de la Cadena to finance the dowry for that to happen.
4	"Este amoroso tormento" "This Lovely Torture"	Emilio Maillé	Javier Peñalosa & Monika Revilla	April 16, 2016
Juana Inés is ordered to be a nun. The regent Mariana of Austria orders the Viceroy Marquis of Mancera to return to Spain. Vicereine Leonor becomes extremely debilitated and mentally altered from the prospect of leaving Juana Inés and dies on the road to Veracruz. Tomás Antonio de la Cerda y Aragón and his wife María Luisa Manrique de Lara arrive in New Spain as the new viceroys. The newly appointed Archbishop of Mexico, Francisco de Aguiar and Seijas, wants to meet Juana Ines, who has had the audacity to write the Triumphal Arch of the Metropolitan Cathedral to welcome the new viceroys.
5	"Divina Lysi" "Divine Lysi"	Emilio Maillé	Monika Revilla	April 23, 2016
Juana Inés and the new vicereine are left with arrows. One of the nuns at the Convent of San Jerónimo is found to have an advanced pregnancy, leading Archbishop Aguiar and Seijas to harden the measures of confinement of the nuns and he fixes his look on Juana Ines. Prior Maria suspects and obtains letters of love between them, which she hands over to Father Núñez, who threatens to make them public. Juana Inés dismisses him as his confessor. A love and secret relationship arises between Juana Ines and the vicereine.
6	"Detened la mano" "Hold the Hand"	Emilio Maillé	Javier Peñalosa & Monika Revilla	April 30, 2016
The Vicereine María Luisa notifies Juana Inés her return to Spain, in compliance with the king's provisions, but promises to publish her texts in Europe. Father Núñez asks Juana Inés for the delivery of all his writings, considering it inappropriate for a wife of Christ to send them to the press and return her threat to make public her love letters. Some nuns of the congregation help Juana Inés to copy the works that Núñez intends to confiscate.
7	"La vida con que muero" "The Life I Die"	Julián de Tavira	Patricia Arriaga-Jordán & Monika Revilla	May 7, 2016
Archbishop Aguiar and Seijas orders to find out possible faults of Juana Inés as a religious. Meanwhile, Castalid flood is a success in Spain, from where Maria Luisa, Countess of Paredes, tries to defend it. The archbishop forces Juana Inés to choose between being a public figure or wife of Christ; Juana Inés opts for the latter and delivers her belongings and books for charity. She is committed not to write more and dedicate to her work as a religious. In the spring of 1695 an epidemic breaks out in Mexico City and Juana Inés insists on taking care of her dying sisters. Juana Inés falls ill and dies on the 15th of April. Several files among her belongings confirm that, in fact, she never stopped writing.

== Awards and nominations ==
Year	Award	Category	Nominated	Result
2016	Pantalla de Cristal Film Festival	Best Series	Juana Inés	Won
2016	Pantalla de Cristal Film Festival	Best Director	Patricia Arriaga-Jordán, Emilio Maillé & Julián de Tavira	Won
2016	Pantalla de Cristal Film Festival	Best Production Values	Patricia Arriaga-Jordán	Won
2016	Pantalla de Cristal Film Festival	Best Photography	Luis Ávila	Won
2016	Pantalla de Cristal Film Festival	Best Postproduction	Juana Inés	Nominated
2016	Pantalla de Cristal Film Festival	Best Edition	Juana Inés	Won
2016	Pantalla de Cristal Film Festival	Best Screenplay	Monika Revilla, Patricia Arriaga-Jordán & Javier Peñalosa	Won
2016	Pantalla de Cristal Film Festival	Best Casting	Luis Maya	Won
2016	Pantalla de Cristal Film Festival	Best Art	Marisa Pecanins	Won
2016	Pantalla de Cristal Film Festival	Best Investigation	Patricia Arriaga-Jordán	Won
2016	Pantalla de Cristal Film Festival	Best Actress	Arantza Ruiz	Won
2016	Pantalla de Cristal Film Festival	Best Actor	Hernán Del Riego	Won
2016	Pantalla de Cristal Film Festival	Best Soundtrack	Michael Nyman & Nicolas Engel	Nominated
2016	Pantalla de Cristal Film Festival	Best Audio	Javier Umpierrez	Nominated
