= Pedro Berruguete =

15th-century Spanish painter

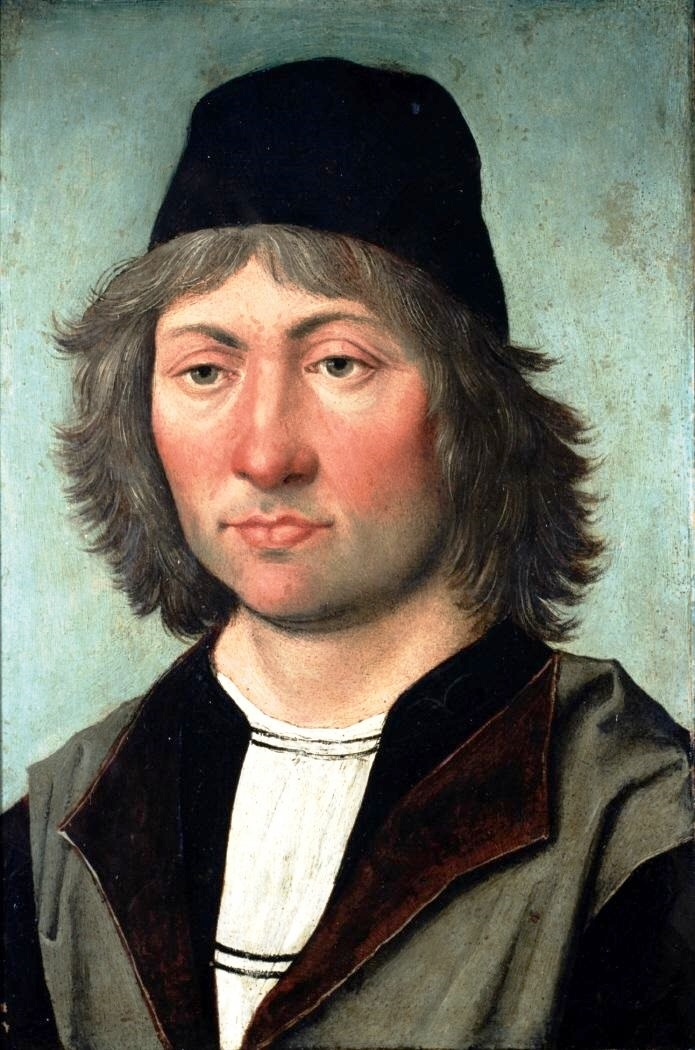
Possible self-portrait

Pedro Berruguete (c. 1450 – 1504) was a Spanish painter who adopted Flemish techniques and conventions and so is part of the Hispano-Flemish style. Berruguete most famously created paintings of the first few years of the Inquisition and of religious imagery for Castilian retablos. He is considered by some as the first Renaissance painter in Spain.

He was the father of Alonso Berruguete, considered the most important sculptor of the Spanish Renaissance. Because of the fame accrued by Alonso, Pedro Berruguete is sometimes referred to as Berruguete el Viejo ("Berruguete the Elder") to differentiate between the two.

It is speculated that Pedro travelled to Italy in 1480 and worked in the court of Federico III da Montefeltro in Urbino, where he could have seen some works by Melozzo da Forlì. The Portrait of Federico da Montefeltro with His Son Guidobaldo (c. 1475), now at the Galleria nazionale delle Marche, has been attributed to Berruguete by some art historians but the Flemish painter Justus van Gent, who was working in Urbino at the time, is another strong candidate for its authorship.

Berruguete returned to Spain in 1482 and painted in several cities, including Toledo and Ávila. His exact date of death is unknown and often approximated around 1503–1504. He may have died in Madrid, but no verifiable documentation has been found to substantiate this claim.

== Life ==
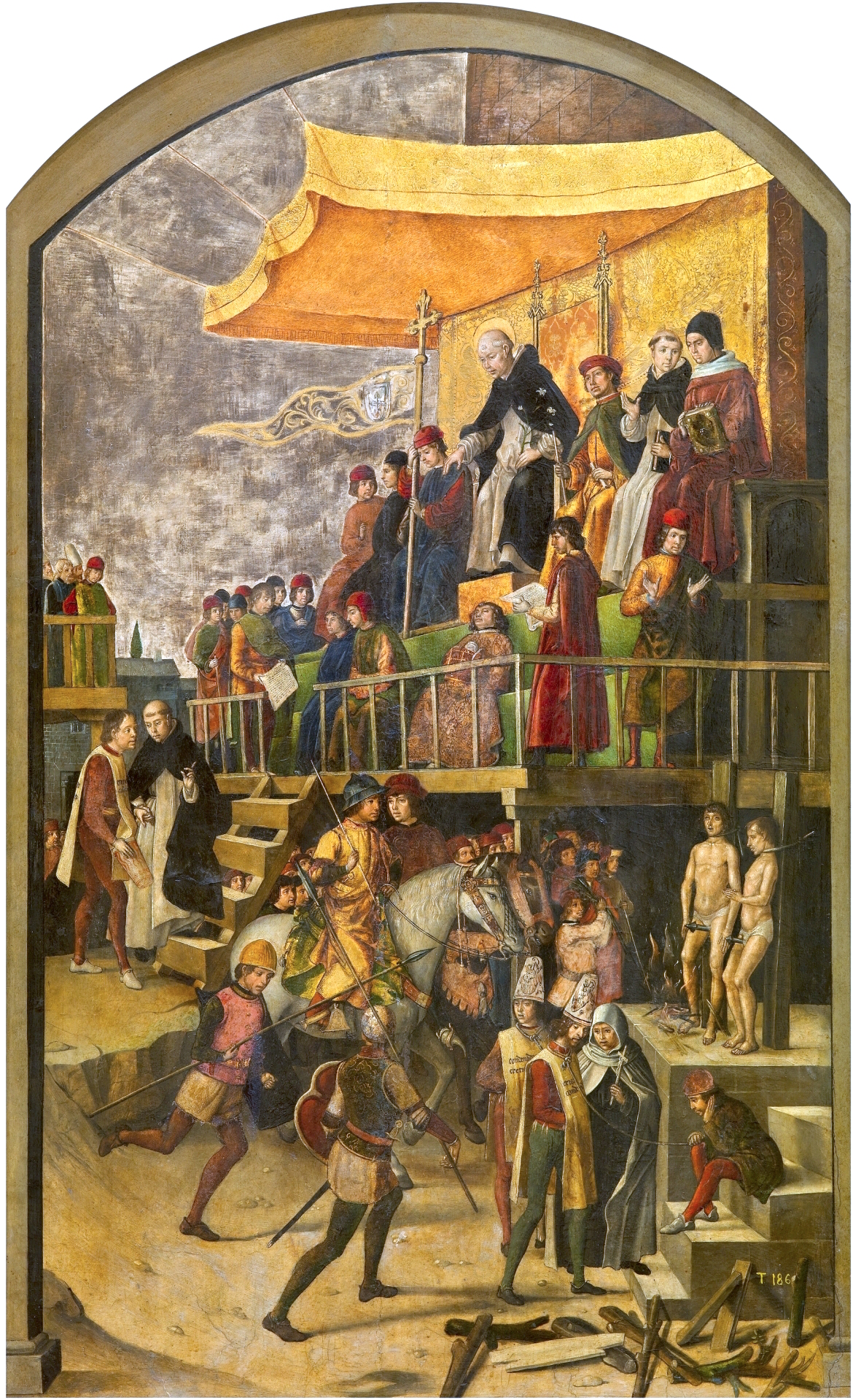
Saint Dominic Presiding over an Auto-de-fe, c. 1495, Museo del Prado, Madrid.

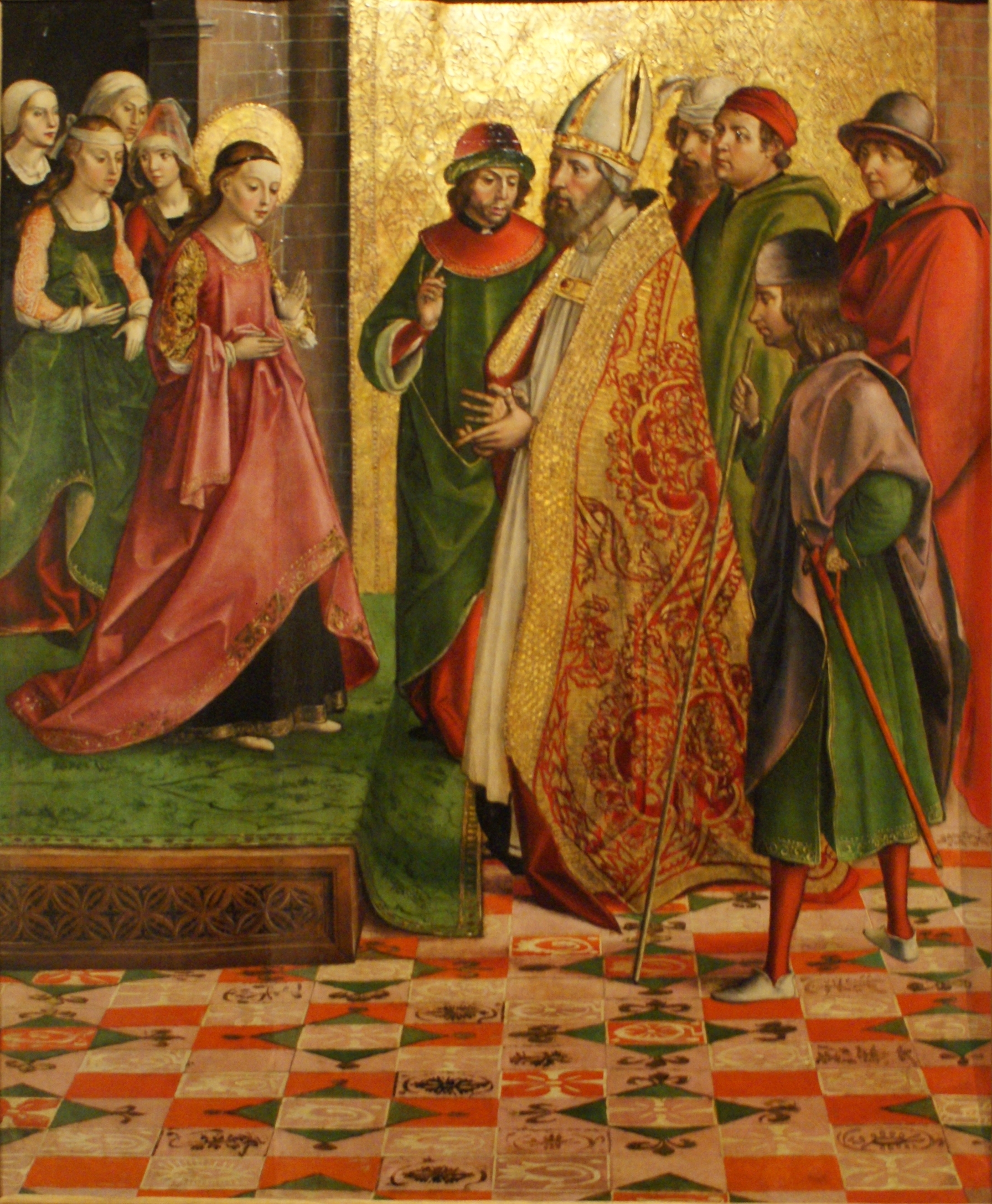
Los Pretendientes de la Virgen, c. 1485-1490, Museo Diocesano de Palencia.

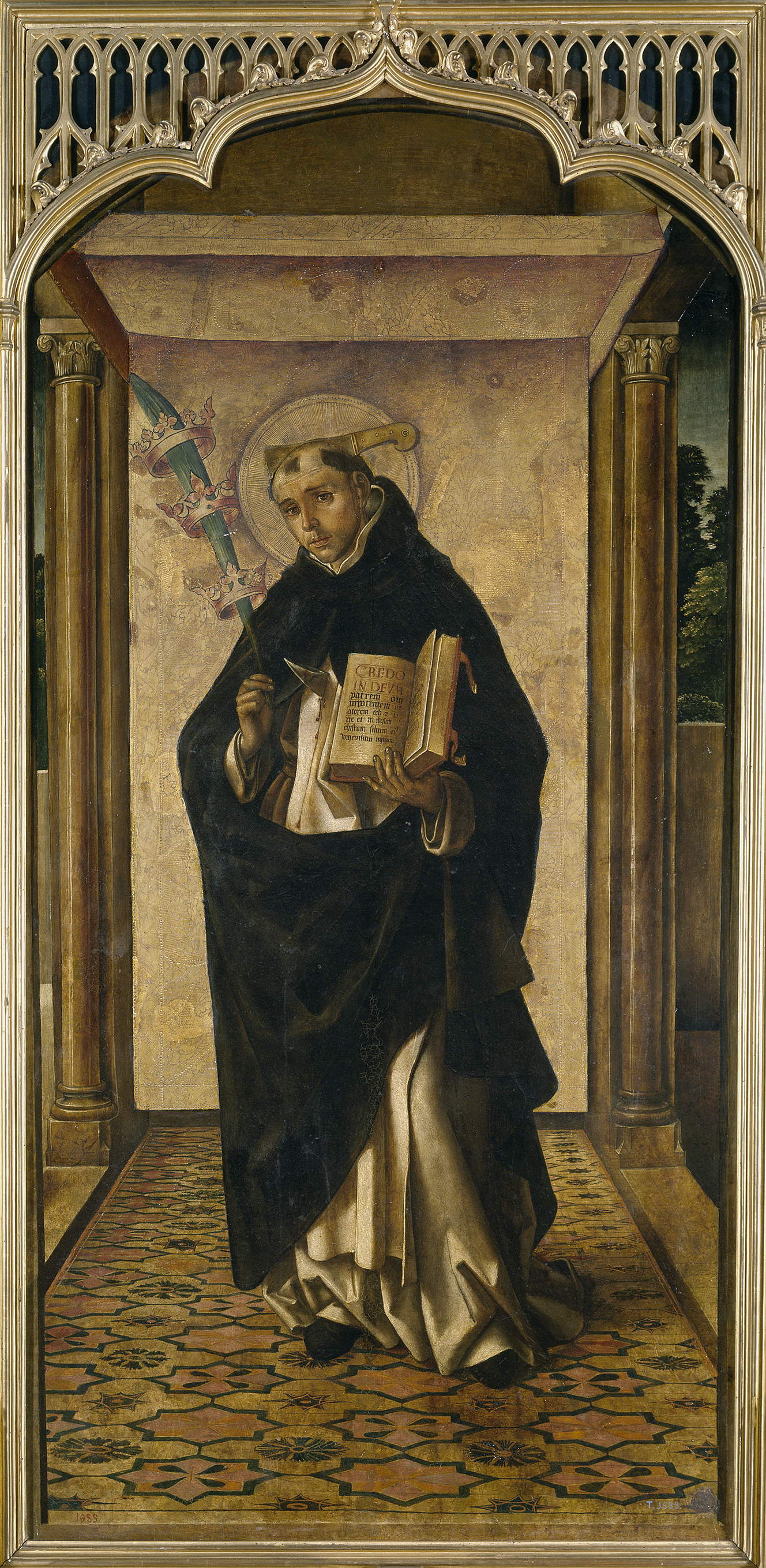
Saint Peter the Martyr, 1493, Museo del Prado, Madrid.

Born in Paredes de Nava, Kingdom of Castille, c. 1450, his exact year of birth is unknown. His family was from Paredes de Nava and he received his namesake from his grandfather. Though the last 15 years of his life seem to be better documented, a lack of documentation of his early life and works leaves much about his biography and education up to speculation. The lack of a signature and documents make it difficult to assuredly attribute paintings to the artist, but many paintings have been attributed to him based on his unique style and a few have been identified through documentation. This makes it hard to precisely date many paintings as well as to create a correct chronology. However, the last 15 years of his life seem to be better documented.

He married Elvira González in Paredes de Nava at a later age and had 6 children with her, including Alonso Berruguete, the famous sculptor.

Because of a large amount of his paintings residing in Ávila, it is thought that Berruguete might have established a studio there in the 1490s.

In 2003, to commemorate the fifth centenary of the painter's death, he was the subject of an exhibition in his hometown, Paredes de Nava, which brought together the best of his paintings and clarified some aspects of his life and work. The exhibition also served to stylistically compare his works from Paredes de Nava with works attributed to him from Urbino.

== Possible presence at Urbino ==
There seems to be a lack of documentation of Berruguete living in Spain during the years of 1471 to 1483. In 1604, a Sevilla artist named Pablo Céspedes wrote about a Spanish painter who had painted a series of famous men for the studio of the Duke of Urbino. A ‘Petrus spagnuolus’ or ‘Pietro spagnolo’, which would translate to Pedro the Spaniard, is documented as painting in the court of Federico Montefeltro in 1477 where he would have collaborated and interacted with a man known as Justus of Ghent. Scholars lean towards the idea that the style of a ‘Petrus spagnuolus’ working for Federico Montefeltro during this period directly correlates to the style of Pedro Berruguete in his later paintings and have attributed some of these paintings to him as well as the Justus of Ghent.

Additionally, it is believed that he returned to Spain after his stay in Italy and brought the influence of Italian Renaissance painting back to his country and it impacted his work in Castile. There is no direct documentation of Berruguete making a trip to Italy or residing there. A major difference in the work of Petrus spagnuolus is that the paintings in Italy were executed in oil while Pedro Berruguete’s are completed in tempera grassa.

== Style and technique ==
Consisting almost exclusively of religious images, Pedro Berruguete's artwork is identifiable by the unique facial features of both his male and female figures, the amount of brocateado and gilding he uses on garments and backgrounds, his use of color and his architectural framing devices.

Berruguete's male figures tend to have focused gazes and characteristically large hands with detailed wrinkles. His female figures are usually depicted in interior scenes and tend to have heavy eyelids and round cheeks.

Architectural spaces are found in almost all of his paintings, excluding bust portraits of holy or biblical figures. The forms show influence from Gothic architecture as well as the Mudéjar style that was abundantly present in Spain.

Berruguete made heavy use of gilding in almost all of his pieces, employing it in halos, garments, and backgrounds architectural or otherwise. The gold leaf is often incorporated into elaborate brocaded designs, which are used on the costumes of important figures or as a tapestry-like background.

== Work ==
=== First stage ===
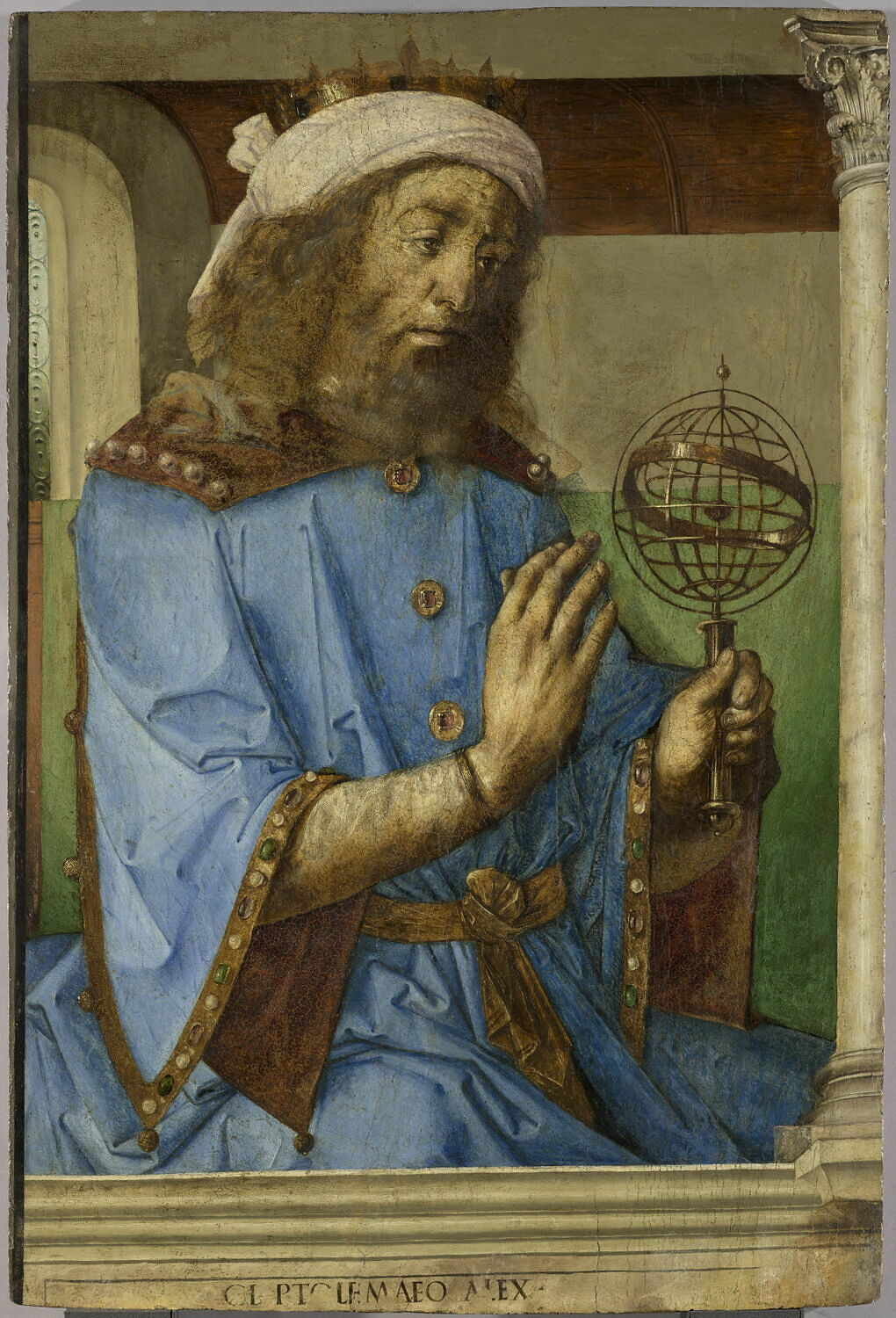
Ptolemy with an armillary sphere model, by Joos van Ghent and Pedro Berruguete, 1476, Louvre, Paris

Works from his first stage (between 1470 and 1471) include Verification of the cross of Christ in the Church of San Juan of Paredes de Nava and the Adoration of the Magi in the Alvarez Fisa collection. Because his earlier works are lacking documentation, the dates are estimated by his later shift in style. This short introductory phase of his is due to his young age during this time and possibly his suspected trip to Italy.

The panels for the Verification of the Cross of Christ depict 2 scenes from the story of the True Cross and 4 images of the Evangelists. The Adoration of the Magi is considered to be one of his oldest works.

These early paintings have figures that are much more simplified than the realistic and detailed figures of his later stages. His signature use of brocade designs, gilding and the use of architectural spaces within painting are present, but the recession of space and use of perspective looks awkward and his figures look less realistic than the figures in his third stage after he refines his style.

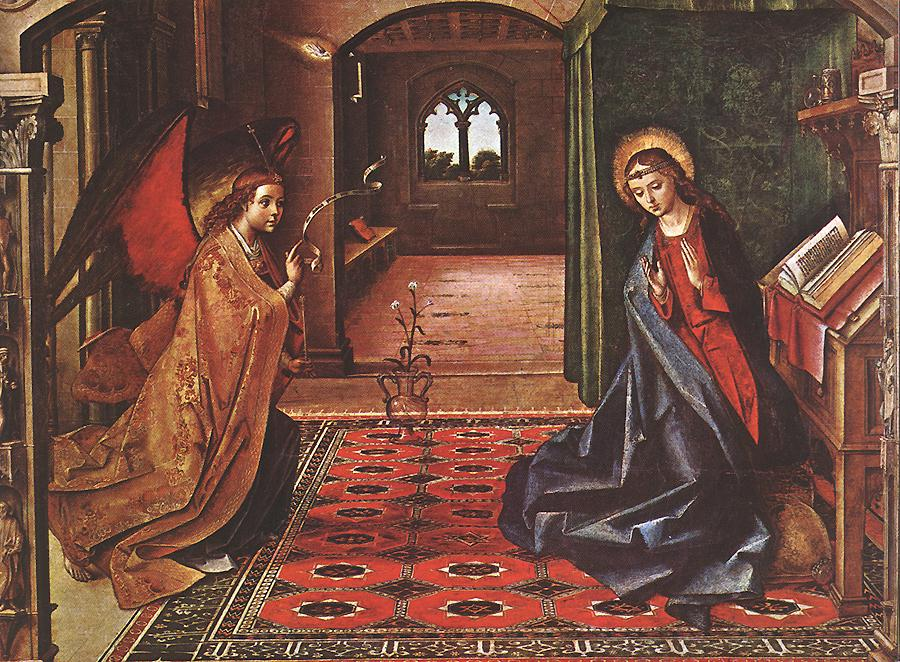
The Annunciation, late 1400s, Cartuja de Miraflores (Burgos)

=== Second stage (1471–1483) ===
In his second stage it is speculated that he travelled in Italy. There is little documentation of the work of Berruguete at this time, and there are controversies as to authorship. The Portrait of Federico da Montefeltro and His Son Guidobaldo (Gallery of the Marches, Ducal Palace in Urbino), and the series of Famous Men of which it forms part (Louvre Museum, Paris and Galleria Nazionale, Urbino) are sometimes attributed to him although they are also attributed to the Flemish painter Justus van Gent. It may also have been a collaboration between the two artists, with Berruguete working on the series while working in van Ghent's workshop in Urbino. This stay in Italy would have been interrupted by a return trip to Paredes de Nava in 1478 for marriage, after which he returned to Italy. If he indeed travel to Italy, this would explain the influence of Flemish and Italian Renaissance style inclusive in his third stage of Castilian art.

=== Third stage (1483–1503) ===
His masterpieces are the paintings of the kings of Judah, noting especially King David, which are situated on the high altar of the church of Santa Eulalia de Paredes de Nava (Palencia) illustrating scenes from the Life of the Virgin and portraits of several biblical kings. Despite archaic elements (frontal composition, gold background), they are a gallery of portraits of intense realism. He created several versions of the birth of the Virgin and scenes from her life for several retables, but the one at Santa Eulalia remains the most famous. This altarpiece is one of the few that can be certainly attributed to Berruguete el Viejo through documentation.

Many of his best works can be seen in different localities of the province of Palencia: The Adoration of the Magi, The Annunciation of St. Mary in the parish of Santa Maria Museum of Becerril de fields; The Suitors of the Virgin and The Crucifixion in the Diocesan Museum of Palencia, and also The Lamentation over the body of Christ in the Cathedral of Palencia.

In the Church of the Assumption, Santa Maria del Campo (Burgos) two important works of his from this period are preserved: Beheading of the Baptist and the Baptism of Christ, which formed part of an altarpiece of the life of the Baptist, datable between 1483 and 1485, being among the first works of this third stage. Innovations in composition and perspective learned in Italy are evident in these two works.

Another piece that Berruguete is famous for creating during this stage is Saint Dominic Presiding over an Auto-da-fé, commissioned, most likely, by the General Inquisitor Tomás de Torquemada for the Dominican convent of Santo Tomás in Ávila. Made when the Inquisition was still new to Spain, this painting depicted an Auto-da-fé ceremony, or an act of faith ceremony, where heretics were tortured and put to death. The figure of Saint Dominic, who lived in the 13th-century is dressed contemporarily for 15th-century Spain and the scene is depicted in the same manner.

The Annunciation of the Cartuja de Miraflores is notable for the detail in objects and interesting set of perspectives, which creates a perfect illusion of space. This piece incorporates a northern influence with contemporary Spanish style in an interior scene and was supposedly commissioned by Queen Isabel. In all these works the figures are highly individualized, and mastery of space, perspective and composition is enriched with an accurate sense of design and a wise use of color.

Berruguete's last assignment was the high altar of the Ávila Cathedral, which he was unable to finish due to his death. He painted for this work of late Gothic architecture several paintings of episodes from the life of Christ for the altarpiece, and figures of patriarchs for the predella. These paintings, perhaps reflecting the prevailing style in Castile at the time, use gold backgrounds and somewhat rigid compositions. The figures are of a more robust and monumental form than in previous works, perhaps in order to stand out in the distance of the main chapel. After the master's death the altarpiece was completed by Juan de Borgoña.

== Gallery ==
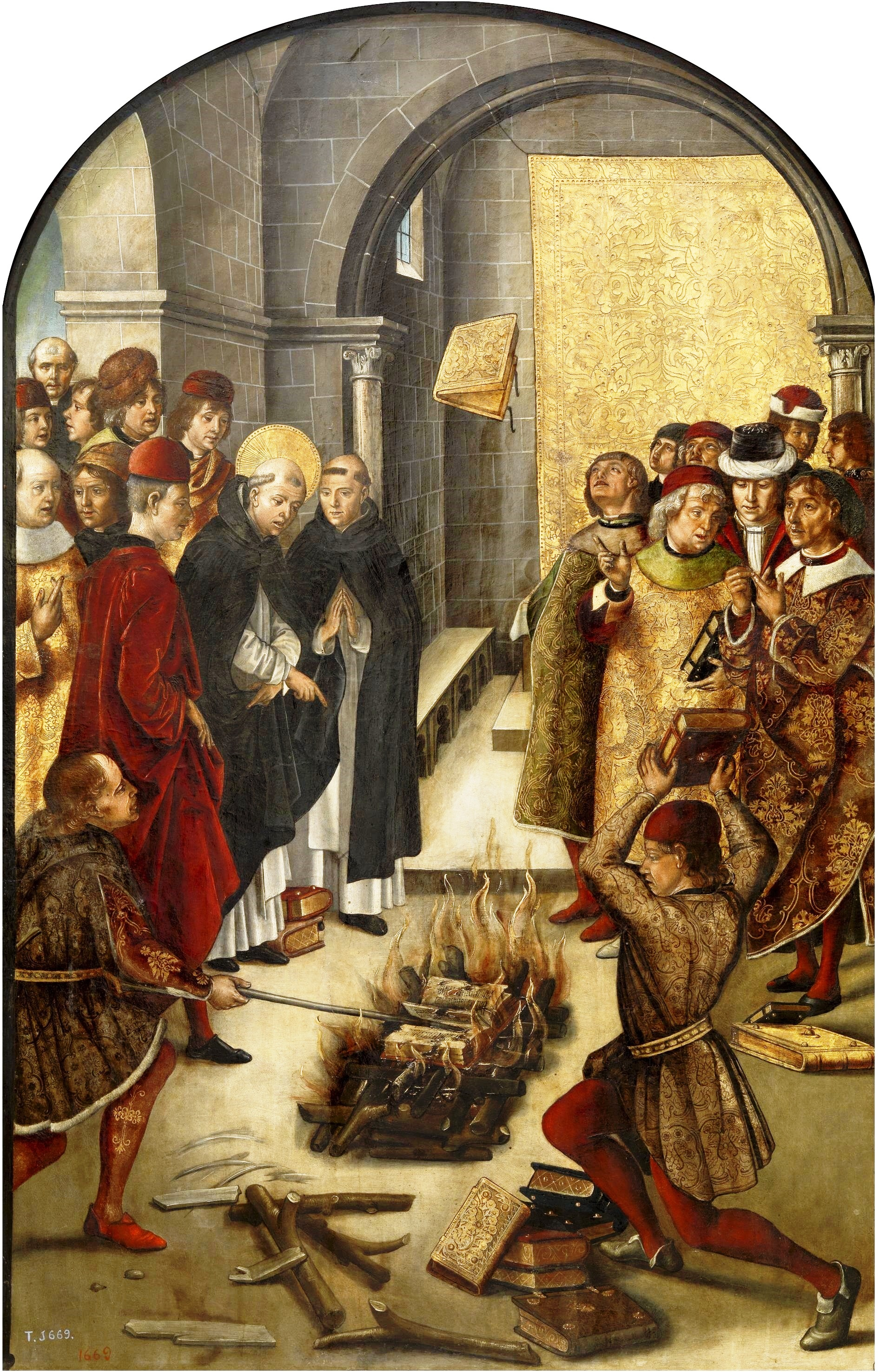
St. Dominic and the Albigenses, unknown year, Museo del Prado, Madrid.

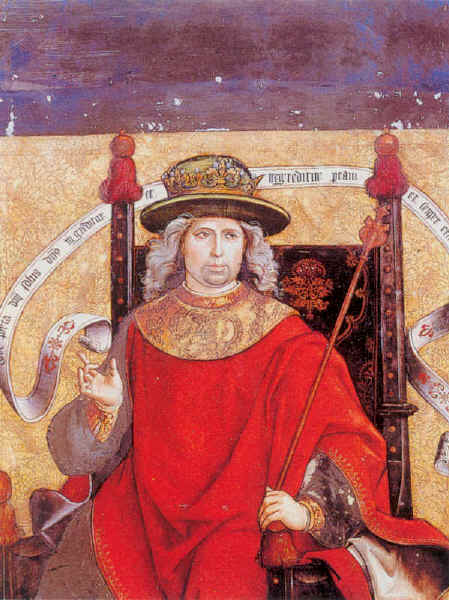
The Prophet Ezechiel, c. 1500, Museo Diocesano de Palencia.

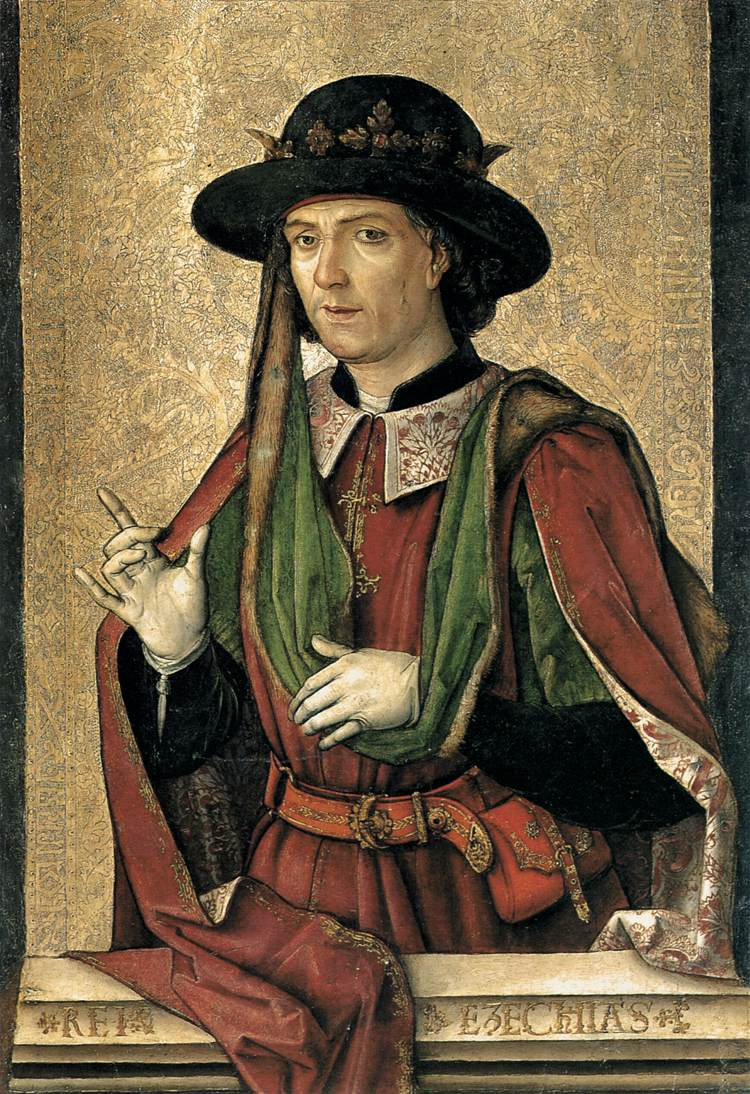
Ezechiel, c. 1500, Museo Diocesano de Palencia.

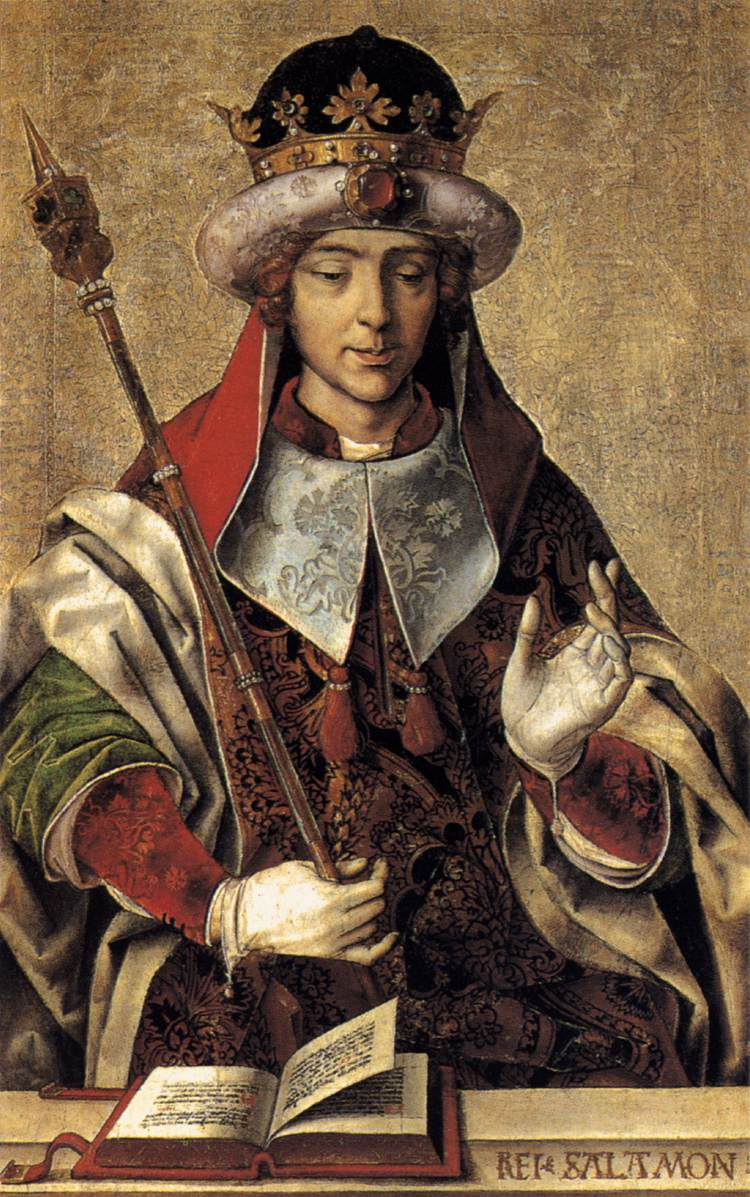
Solomon, circa 1500, Church of Santa Eulalia, Paredes de Nava, Spain.

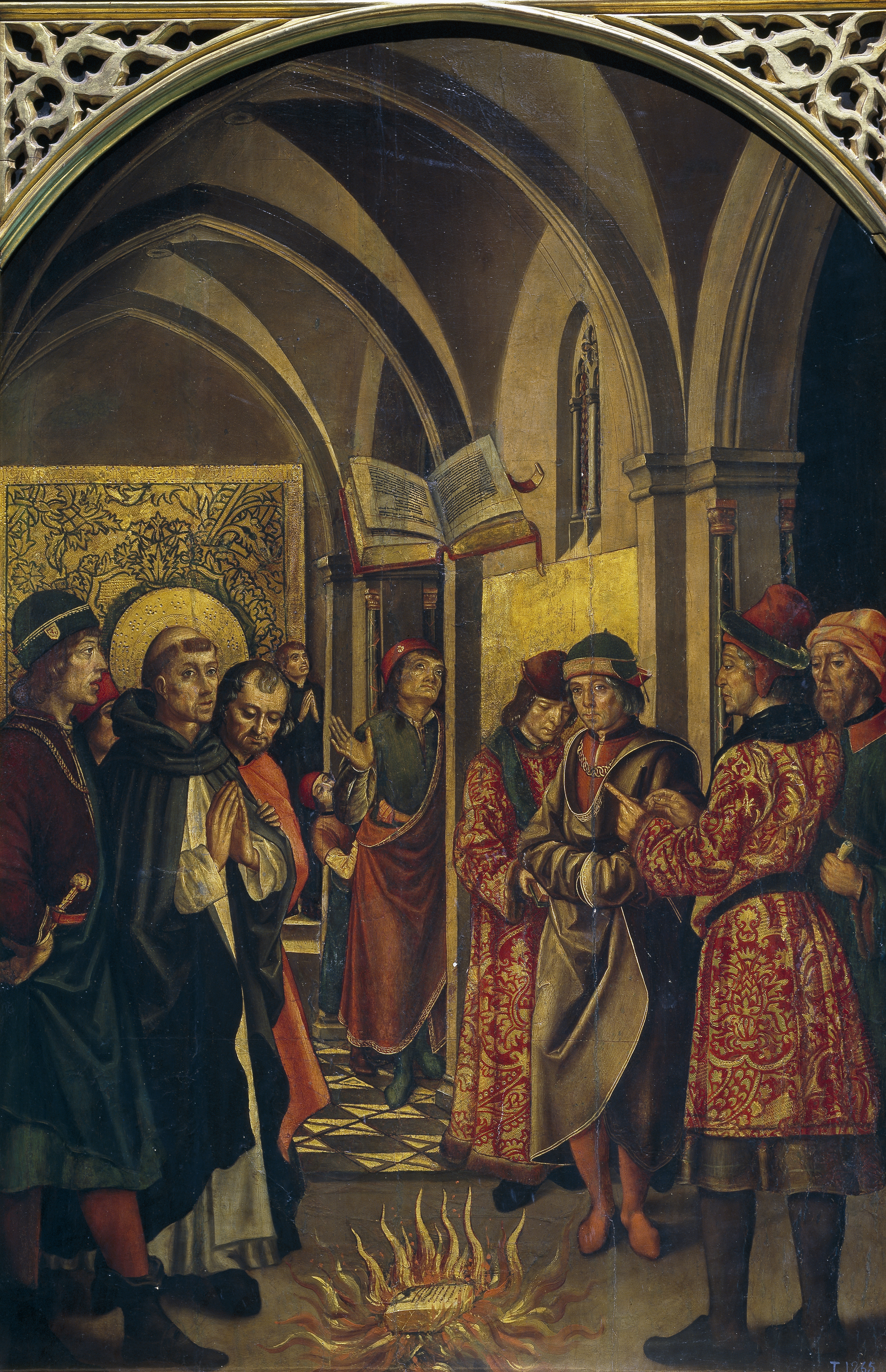
The Proof of Fire, c. 1480-1500, Museo del Prado, Madrid.

== See also ==
- Renaissance in Urbino

== Sources ==
- Brown, Jonothan (1991).The Golden Age of Painting in Spain. Yale University Press. ISBN 978-0-300-04760-8
- Campbell, Gordon (2003) "Berruguete, Pedro (c. 1450-c. 1500)" The Oxford Dictionary of the Renaissance Oxford University Press, Oxford;
- Carter, David Giles. "Justus of Ghent, Berruguete, and the Court of Urbino." Art Quarterly, no. 21 (Spring 1958): 40-46;
- Chilvers, Ian and Osborne, Harold (eds.) (1988) "Berruguete, Pedro (d. 1504)" The Oxford Dictionary of Art Oxford University Press, Oxford;
- Galperín, Karina. "The Passion According to Berruguete: Painting the Auto-de-Fé and the Establishment of the Inquisition in Early Modern Spain." Journal of Spanish Cultural Studies 14 (2013): 315-347;
- Langmuir, Erika and Lynton, Norbert (2000) "Berruguete, Pedro (d. 1504)" The Yale Dictionary of Art and Artists Yale University Press, New Haven, CT;
- Osborne, Harold (ed.) (1970) "Berruguete, Pedro (d. c. 1503)" The Oxford Companion to Art Oxford University Press, Clarendon Press, Oxford, England;
- Marías, Fernando, and Felipe Pereda. "Petrus Hispanus En Urbino Y El Bastón Del Gonfaloniere: El Problema Pedro Berruguete En Italia Y La Historiografía Española." Archivo Español De Arte 75 (2002): 361-80;
- Myers, Bernard S. (ed.) (1969) "Berruguete, Pedro" McGraw-Hill Dictionary of Art McGraw-Hill, New York;
- Parry, Melanie (ed.) (1997) "Berruguete, Pedro (1450-1504)" Chambers Biographical Dictionary Sixth edition, Larousse Kingfisher Chambers, New York;
- Silva, Pilar. Pedro Berruguete. Salamanca: Junta De Castilla Y León, Consejería De Educación Y Cultura, 1998;
- Silva, Pilar. Pedro Berruguete: El Primer Pintor Renacentista De La Corona De Castilla: Iglesia De Santa Eulalia, Paredes De Nava (Palencia), Del 4 De Abril Al 8 De Junio De 2003. Junta De Castilla Y León, Consejería De Educación Y Cultura, 2003;
- Strehlke, Carl Brandon. "Pedro Berruguete. Paredes De Nava (Palencia)." The Burlington Magazine 145, no. 1204 (July 2003): 539-41;
- Webb, Jennifer D. "All Is Not Fun and Games: Conversation, Play, and Surveillance at the Montefeltro Court in Urbino." Renaissance Studies 26, no. 3 (July 14, 2011): 417-40.
