= El Tapado =

Unidentified Spanish traveler

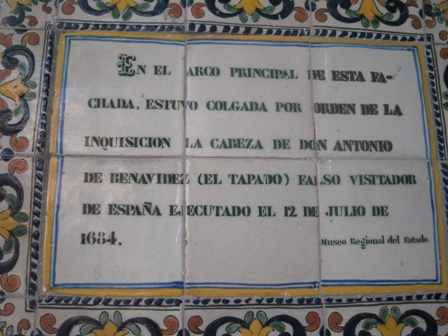
Execution date of Antonio Benavidez at la Compañía Church in Puebla

"El Tapado" (Santo Domingo, 1627 - Mexico City, July 12, 1684), who claimed to be Antonio Benavides, marquis of San Vicente, was a mysterious person who arrived in New Spain in 1683, claiming to be visitor general and governor of the colony, and governor of the castle of Acapulco, appointed by the Court in Spain.

== Biography ==
El Tapado disembarked at Veracruz on May 22, 1683, about the same time that the pirate Lorencillo and his men occupied and looted the port. It is possible that he was a confidential messenger or inspector from Queen Regent Mariana of Austria, but he was unable to establish his credentials.

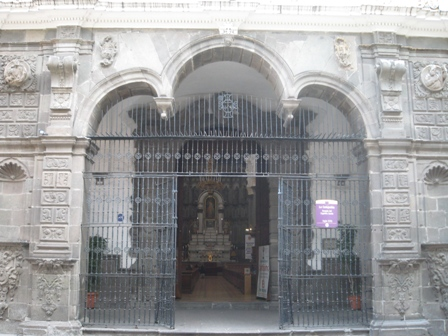
Gate of la Compañía Church in Puebla where the head of El Tapado was displayed

He was arrested at Cuetlaxcoapa (Puebla), accused of being in league with the pirates. From there he was conducted to Mexico City in fetters. In Mexico City, in a place called Xico, he was taken to the scaffold (July 12, 1684). At the time of his execution, an eclipse of the sun was seen. The common people, who had given the arrested his nickname of El Tapado (the "covered-up", or "hidden"), viewed the eclipse as a sign from God that an innocent man was about to be executed. Nevertheless, the authorities continued with the hanging.

Afterwards, the head of El Tapado was taken to Puebla and displayed in front of the door of the la Compañía Church. The reason for this is not known.
