= Melchor Portocarrero, 3rd Count of Monclova =

Mexican politician

Don Melchor Portocarrero Count of Monclova
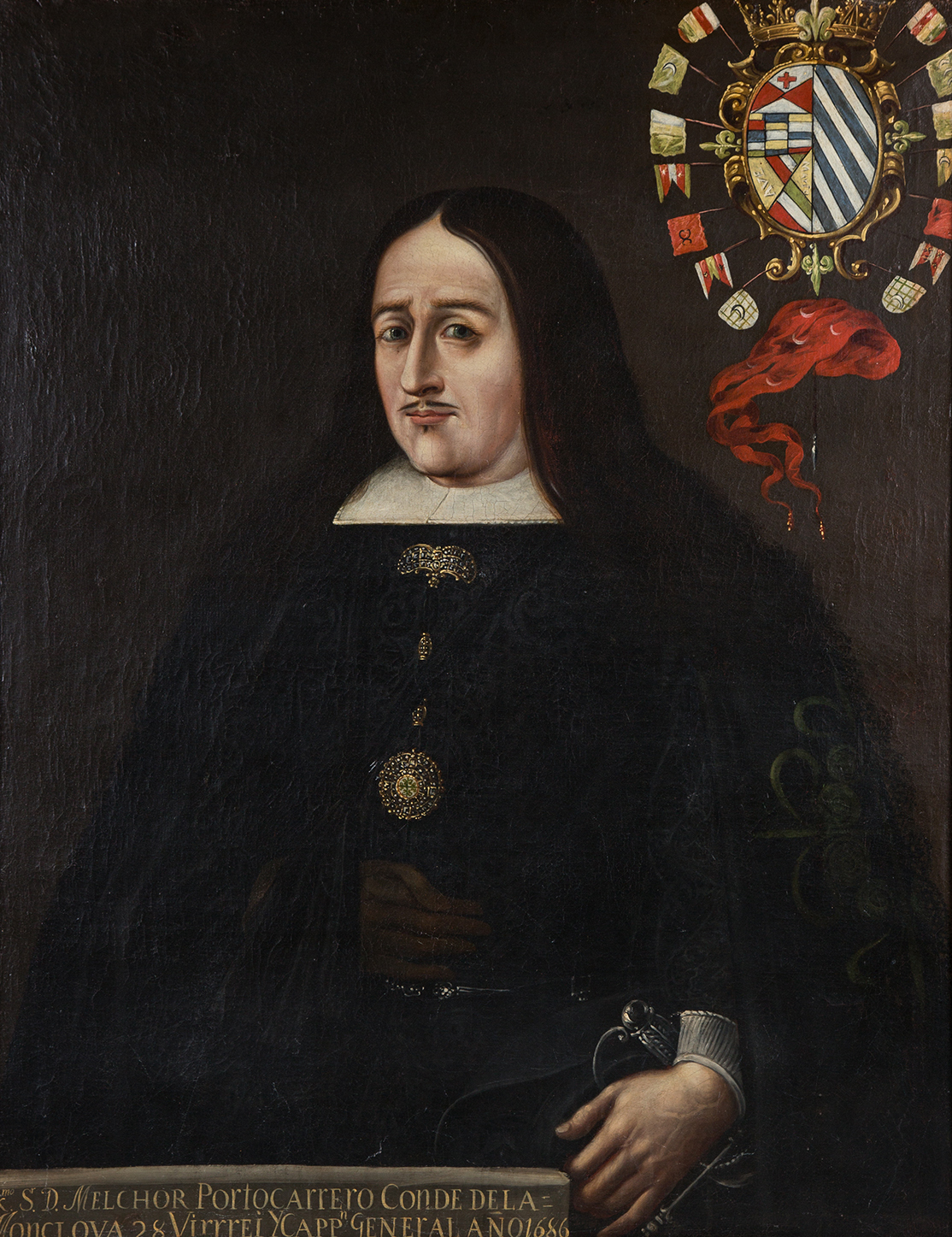

23rd Viceroy of Peru
- In office September 15, 1689 – August 15, 1705
- Monarchs: Charles II; Philip V
- Valido: Count of Oropesa; Luis Fernández Portocarrero
- Secretary of the Universal Bureau: Antonio de Ubilla
- Preceded by: Melchor de Navarra
- Succeeded by: Juan Peñalosa y Benavides

29th Viceroy of New Spain
- In office June 16, 1686 – November 20, 1688
- Monarch: Charles II
- Valido: Count of Oropesa
- Preceded by: Tomas Antonio Manuel Lorenzo de la Cerda
- Succeeded by: Gaspar Melchor Baltasar de la Cerda

Personal details
- Born: 1636 Madrid
- Died: September 15, 1705 (aged 68–69) Lima

Don Melchor Portocarrero y Lasso de la Vega, 3rd Count of Monclova (1636, Madrid – September 15, 1705, Lima) was viceroy of New Spain from November 30, 1686 to November 19, 1688 and viceroy of Peru from August 1689 to 1705.

== Military career ==
A lieutenant general of cavalry, Portocarrero y Lasso de la Vega distinguished himself on campaign with John of Austria the Younger in Sicily, Flanders, Catalonia and Portugal. He was in the Battle of Arras, Condé and Saint Guillaume. He lost his right arm in the Battle of the Dunes at Dunkirk in June 1658. He had a prosthesis made of silver, and his soldiers nicknamed him Brazo de Plata (Arm of Silver).

He was minister of the Council of the Indies and of the Real Junta de Guerra de las Indias (Royal War Council of the Indies). He also served as captain general of New Spain during his term as viceroy.

== As viceroy of New Spain ==
He was named viceroy of New Spain on April 17, 1686 under the authority of King Charles II of Spain. Upon arriving in Veracruz, he stayed there a few days in order to gather intelligence on whether the French had established a base on the Gulf coast. (France and Spain were then at war.) He ordered two well-armed brigantines to sail the coast to a point now on the east coast of the United States to look for a French colony. (They didn't actually sail that far.)

He arrived in Chapultepec November 5, 1686 and took the oath of office on November 16. His formal entry into Mexico City took place on November 30, 1686 and his term of office is dated from that day.

The following month three English pirates arrived in the city under heavy guard. They had been taken prisoner at the Laguna de Términos, stating that they had been among a group of 100 English who had arrived seven months earlier to cut precious woods to be sent to Jamaica. The viceroy took steps to expel them.

The two brigantines returned, bringing news that they had found a few small ships and a half-built fort at San Bernardo Bay, Texas, but that the builders of the fort had been killed by Indians.

He ordered the construction of another aqueduct for Mexico City. This aqueduct ran from Alberca Chica of Chapultepec, at the foot of the hill, along the boulevards of Tacubaya and Arcos de Belén to a point in the city given the name El Salto del Agua (The Waterfall, literally Water Jump). This work, 3,908 meters long with 904 masonry arches was finally finished in 1779, during the term of Viceroy Antonio María Bucareli y Ursúa. Portocarrero bore the cost from his own pocket.

Fearing the presence of the French in San Bernardo and Espíritu Santo, Portocarrero accelerated the pacification of the province of Nueva Extremadura de Coahuila and named Captain Alonso de León governor. On August 12, 1689, de León founded the city of Santiago de la Monclova, named for the viceroy. One hundred fifty families were established there, including 270 well-armed men to repulse any incursions of the French. The viceroy also ordered the repair or construction of other forts farther north, all in communication with each other.

The viceroy ordered increased vigilance along the Gulf coast beyond Tampico, to guard against the forces of René-Robert Cavelier, Sieur de La Salle, marauding from Fort St. Louis in Matagorda (Texas). He expelled all foreign priests without licenses to preach in the colony.

== As viceroy of Peru ==
Portocarrero was named viceroy of Peru on May 3, 1688, the last viceroy of New Spain to be transferred there. He turned over the government to his successor, Gaspar de la Cerda, 8th Count of Galve on November 19, 1688, but did not depart until the following year, for lack of transport. On May 11, 1689 he sailed from the port of Acapulco. He died in Lima in 1705.

His daughter, Doña María Mercedes Portocarrero y Zamudio married Don José Manuel Tagle y Isasaga, 3rd Marquess of Torre Tagle. He is also the maternal grandfather of Don José Bernardo de Tagle y Portocarrero, 4th Marquess of Torre Tagle, one of the most powerful men in Peru during the early-19th century and who also became the country's president two times.

Government offices
Preceded by The Marquess of la Laguna	Viceroy of New Spain; 1686–1688	Succeeded by The Count of Galve
Preceded by Melchor de Navarra y Rocafull	Viceroy of Peru; 1689–1705	Succeeded by Miguel Núñez de Sanabria
