= Gaspar de la Cerda, 8th Count of Galve =

The Most Excellent The Count of Galve KOA
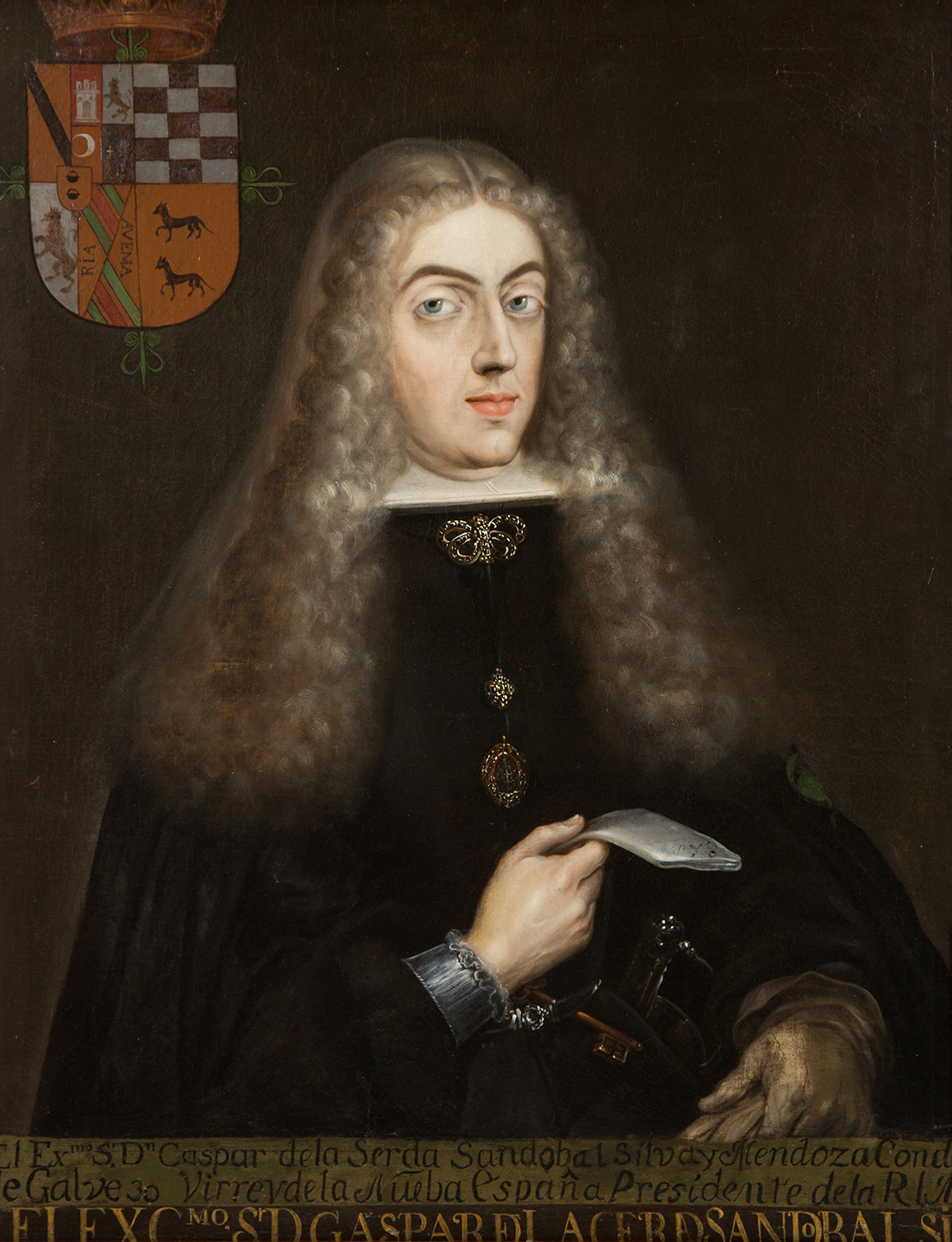

30th Viceroy of New Spain
- In office November 20, 1688 – February 26, 1696
- Monarch: Charles II
- Preceded by: Melchor Portocarrero
- Succeeded by: Juan Ortega

Personal details
- Born: 11 January 1653 Pastrana, Spain
- Died: March 12, 1697 (aged 43) El Puerto de Santa María, Spain

Gaspar de la Cerda Silva Sandoval y Mendoza, 8th Count of Galve, Lord of Salcedón and Tortola (in full, Spanish: Don Gaspar Melchor Baltasar de la Cerda Silva Sandoval y Mendoza, Conde de Gelve y Señor de Salcedón y Tortola) (11 January 1653 – 12 March 1697) was viceroy of New Spain from November 20, 1688, to February 26, 1696.

== As viceroy of New Spain ==
Cerda Sandoval Silva was only 35 years old when he was named viceroy of New Spain, in May 1688. He arrived in Veracruz in the middle of October. On the road from there to Mexico City he met with his predecessor, Melchor Portocarrero, 3rd Count of Monclova, on November 8, 1688. He arrived at Chapultepec on November 11 and took the oath of office before the Audiencia on November 20, 1688. His solemn entry into Mexico City was December 4, 1688, but his term of office is dated from the earlier swearing-in ceremony.

Shortly after his arrival, the viceroy received a message from the governor of New Mexico that three Frenchmen from the French colony in the Seno Mexicano (Texas) had arrived in New Mexico. The viceroy ordered General Alonso de León-González, the governor of Coahuila, to take a detachment of soldiers, a geographer and an interpreter to march to the coast to confront the French. After many days march through desert, the governor arrived in the Bay of San Bernardo, or Espiritu Santo, where he found the French in the process of constructing a fort, but no signs of the French settlers. Hearing from friendly Indians that five of them were with a neighboring tribe in search of workmen, Alonso de León-González sent a detachment to capture them, and after several days the force returned with two of the French adventurers, Jacques Grollet and Jean L'Archeveque, the others having fled. The French held five Spanish prisoners, two of which the Spanish force was able to free. From these ex-prisoners, the governor León-González learned that the French were very interested in colonizing this region.

Also in 1689 the viceroy raised funds from the archbishop and the bishops of the colony to send a fleet from the Pacific port of Acapulco in search of pirates marauding in the southern ocean. He also took steps to fight intruders on the Gulf coast, in Tabasco and Campeche. These were Englishmen cutting precious woods to send to Jamaica and Europe. There were only a few English, supervising Mayans who were doing the actual cutting. The Indian workers were well paid in aguardiente and money.

There were heavy rains in the year 1689, and Cerda Sandoval was diligent in maintaining the drainage works.

In compliance with a royal order of April 1691, Viceroy Cerda Sandoval established schools to teach Spanish to the natives, with considerable success. In the larger populations these were separate schools for boys and for girls, and in the smaller populations, a single school for both sexes.

During his government, the viceroy had to deal with Indian revolts among the Tarahumaras in Nueva Vizcaya, and also among the Indians of Texas. The latter were of a generally peaceful disposition, and had indicated their desire to submit to the Spanish and convert to Christianity. The governor of Coahuila had established a presidio among them, and also a mission. However, the mistreatment received from the Spanish soldiers and the Spanish and Mestizo colonists caused the Indians to revolt. The soldiers and missionaries were forced to abandon their posts. The governor of Coahuila y Tejas was able to pacify the Indians without bloodshed.

=== Mexico City Riot of 1692 ===
In 1692 there was a severe drought, causing a shortage of food. The natives attributed this disaster to the earlier appearance of a comet, but more importantly there was no maize in the capital and many people were hungry. On 8 June 1692 a crowd gathered in front of the viceregal palace, which they set on fire. They threw stones and set the archives on fire. Don Carlos de Sigüenza y Góngora was able to save most of the documents, at the risk of his life. Some nearby houses and shops were also burned. Sigüenza wrote a lengthy and vivid account of the riot, published as "Letter of Don Carlos Sigüenza y Góngora to Admiral Pez Recounting the Incidents of the Corn Riot in Mexico City, June 8, 1692."

The viceroy, who had fled to the convent of San Francisco el Grande, was informed by individuals he trusted of the names of the supposed ringleaders of the rioting. Those arrested were three-quarters were Indians, but mixed race castas, and 4 Spaniards were also caught up in the investigation. Of those arrested in the riot, 66 were Indians, of whom 11 were executed, 32 received corporal punishment, 2 received other punishment, and 20 were absolved. Of the mestizo and castizo arrests, 2 were executed, 6 received corporal punishment, and 4 were absolved. Of the mulattoes arrested, 1 was executed, 2 given corporal punishment, and 2 absolved. In addition to these Indians or mixed raced castas, 4 Spaniards were arrested, of whom 1 was executed, 2 received corporal punishment or labor service, and one received other punishment. Overall, 15 were executed, 42 received corporal punishment or labor service, 3 received other punishment (2 public humiliation, 1 public humiliation and exile), and 26 were absolved. Although crown authorities saw the need to administer quick justice, the legal system functioned such that many under suspicion were absolved due to lack of evidence. Those convicted were overwhelmingly male and in all 31 were skilled workers, such as shoemakers, hat makers, tailors, bricklayers, plus miscellaneous artisans and apprentices. Unskilled workers included porters, people, water carriers, and one muleteer. Of those sentenced to die, 5 died in prison, but their corpses subsequently publicly hanged, similar to the practice of the Inquisition that exhumed the bones of posthumously convicted heretics or Crypto-Jews and burned them in public autos de fe.

Before leaving Mexico City, the viceroy commissioned Cristóbal de Villalpando to do a painting of the main square of Mexico as a kind of souvenir of his tenure as viceroy. Villalpando's 1695 painting, View of the Zócalo of Mexico City now in a private collection in the UK, shows a vibrant scene of urban life. Strikingly, however, Villalpando depicts the severe fire damage to the viceregal palace. The viceroy's commissioned painting did not paint out the major riot during his tenure that challenged royal authority.

In 1693, Don Carlos de Sigüenza y Góngora published El Mercurio Volante, the first newspaper in New Spain.

In 1695, with English help, the viceroy attacked the French who had established a base on the island of Española. They were obliterated and 81 cannons were captured. In the same year Cerda Sandoval founded the Presidio at Panzacola, Florida.

Also in 1695, during an epidemic, Sor Juana Inés de la Cruz, the great Mexican poet, died in Mexico City.

== Later life ==
In September 1695 Cerda Sandoval asked to return to Spain. He tried to turn over the government of the colony to Manuel Fernández de Santa Cruz, bishop of Puebla, on January 21, 1696. The bishop did not accept, citing his health and his responsibilities as bishop. Shortly thereafter Juan Ortega y Montañés, bishop of Michoacán, did accept the office.

Cerda Sandoval returned to Spain, where he died March 12, 1697, in El Puerto de Santa María.

== Additional information ==
Gutiérrez Lorenzo, María Pilar. De la Corte de Castilla al virreinato de México: el conde de Galve (1653-1697). Madrid: Excelentísima Diputación Provincial, 1993.

Taiano C., Leonor, "Críticas, acusaciones, encomios y justificaciones: escritos en contra y a favor del Conde de Galve". Virreinatos. México: Grupo Editorial Destiempos, 2013, pp. 600–633.

Government offices
Preceded by The Count of Monclova	Viceroy of New Spain; 1688–1696	Succeeded by Juan Ortega
Spanish nobility
Preceded by Catalina de Mendoza	Count of Galve; 1676–1697	Succeeded by Gregorio de Silva
