= Tomás de la Cerda, 3rd Marquess of la Laguna de Camero Viejo =

Spanish noble (1638–1692)

The Most Excellent Tomás de la Cerda 3rd Marquess of la Laguna de Camero Viejo GE KOA
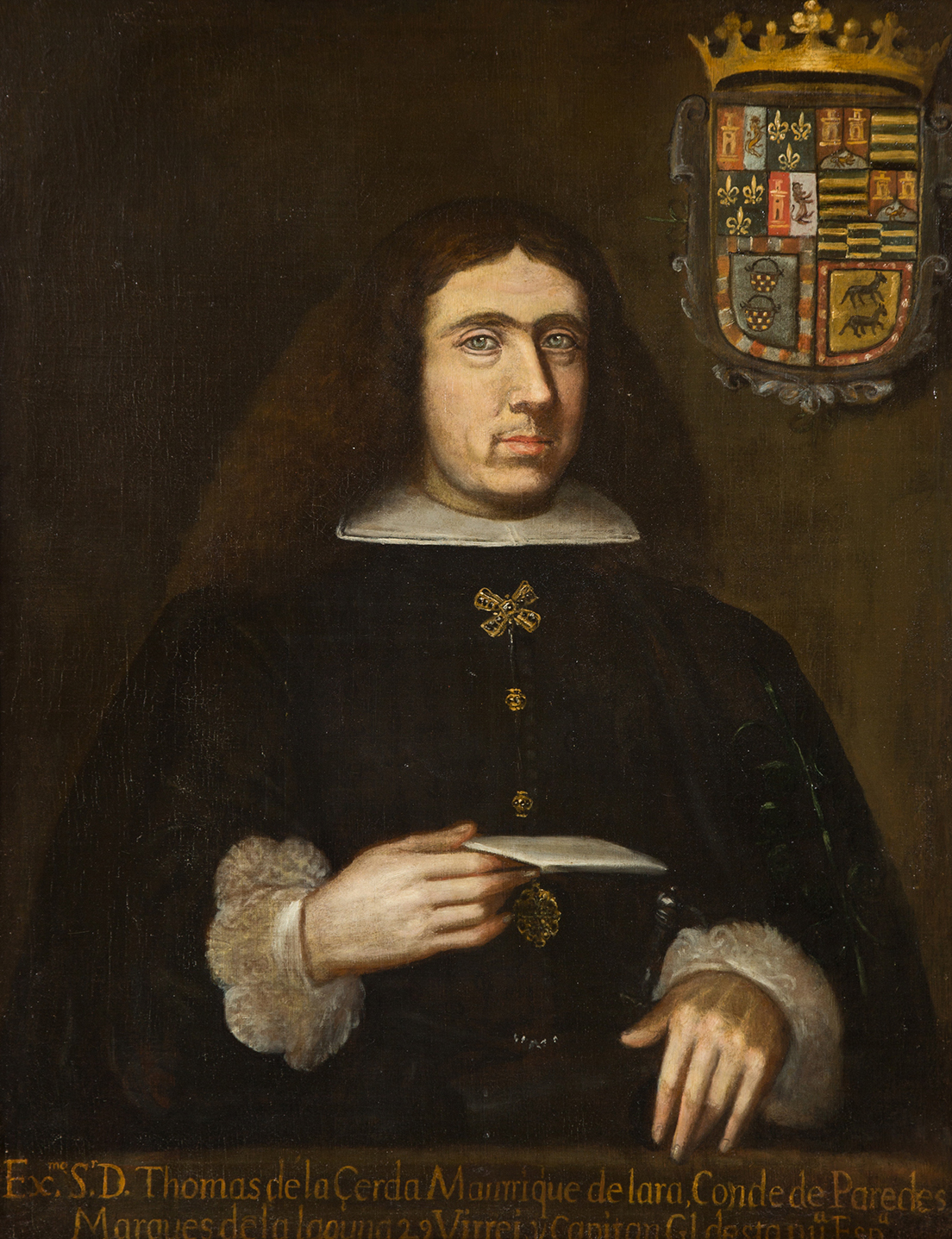

28th Viceroy of New Spain
- In office 30 November 1680 – 16 November 1686
- Monarch: Charles II
- Preceded by: Bishop Payo Enríquez de Rivera
- Succeeded by: The Count of Monclova

Personal details
- Born: 24 December 1638 Cogolludo, Spain
- Died: 22 April 1692 (aged 53) Madrid, Spain
- Spouse: María Luisa Manrique de Lara y Gonzaga, 11th Countess of Paredes

Tomás de la Cerda y Aragón, 3rd Marquess of la Laguna de Camero Viejo, GE, KOA (in full, Spanish: Don Tomás Antonio Manuel Lorenzo de la Cerda y Aragón, tercer marqués de la Laguna de Camero Viejo, Grande de España, caballero de la orden de Alcántara, comendador de la Moraleja, maestre de campo del Tercio Provincial de las Milicias de Sevilla, ministro del Consejo y Cámara de Indias, capitán general de mar Océano, del Ejército y Costas de Andalucía, Virrey de Galicia, Virrey gobernador y capitán general de Nueva España y presidente de su Real Audiencia, Mayordomo mayor de la reina Mariana de Baviera), (24 December 1638 – 22 April 1692), was a Spanish nobleman, viceroy of Galicia and of New Spain from 1680 to 1686. He is better known as the Count of Paredes, though he held this title only as consort.

== Early life ==
Don Tomás de la Cerda was born in Cogolludo, Spain, to an illustrious Spanish family with longstanding military and political connections. He was the 4th child of Don Antonio de la Cerda, 7th Duke of Medinaceli, and Doña Ana Portocarrero, 5th Duchess of Alcalá. In 1675, he married Doña María Luisa Manrique de Lara y Gonzaga, 11th Countess of Paredes, with whom he had three children. In 1679, he was appointed viceroy of Galicia but never assumed the position, as he was almost immediately re-appointed to the more important of viceroy of New Spain.

=== As viceroy of New Spain ===
Don Tomás de la Cerda was named viceroy of New Spain to replace Archbishop Payo Enríquez de Rivera. He made his formal entry into Mexico City on 30 November 1680 and took charge of the government.

=== Triumphal Arches in his Honor ===
Two triumphal arches to welcome the new viceroy were commissioned. One was designed by seventeenth-century savant and professor at the University of Mexico Don Carlos de Sigüenza y Góngora and the other by nun and acclaimed poet, Sor Juana Inés de la Cruz. Their selection for this high honor was important for both, since they were of somewhat marginal status, Sigüenza as a failed Jesuit, Sor Juana as a woman of illegitimate birth. Sigüenza was a creole patriot, "who sought to endow the imperial city of Mexico with both a distinguished past and a glorious present". He published an explanation of the themes of his triumphal arch for the new viceroy, "The Political Virtues That Constitute a Ruler, Observed in the Ancient Monarchs of the Mexican Empire, Whose Effigies Adorn the Arch Erected by the Very Noble Imperial City of Mexico". The structure included niches for the Aztec monarchs of Mexico along with the Aztec god Huitzilopochtli to indicate to the viceroy that Mexico had a royal history prior to its becoming New Spain. Sor Juana's arch took the allegorical theme of Neptune. The title of her explanatory publication was "Allegorical Neptune, Ocean of Colors, Political Simulacrum, Erected by the Noble, Holy, and August Metropolitan Church of Mexico City, in the Magnificent Allegorical Concepts of a Triumphal Arch Solicitously Consecrated and Lovingly Dedicated to the Joyful Entrance of the Most Excellent Don Tomás Antonio de la Cerda, Count of Paredes, Marquess de la Laguna, Viceroy, Governor, and Captain General of Our New Spain". Choosing the theme of "allegorical Neptune" might be her allusion to the viceroy's noble title Marquess de la Laguna (marquess of the lake) and "the arch was a model of the virtues of kings and princes such as Neptune and the Viceroy."The viceroy became a patron of Sor Juana, continuing the practice dating from viceroy Antonio Sebastián Álvarez de Toledo.

=== Pueblo Indian Revolt of 1680 ===
During his term of office, 25,000 Pueblo Indians in 24 pueblos of New Mexico rose against the Spanish and known as the Pueblo Revolt or Popé's Revolt (after the name of the leader). The Indians killed all the Europeans they encountered, among them colonists, soldiers and missionaries. Twenty-one Franciscan missionaries were killed on 10 August 1680. The Indians mounted a surprise attack on Santa Fe, capital of the province. When this failed, they besieged the town for ten days. The Spanish who were able to escape made their way to Paso del Norte (now Ciudad Juárez, Chihuahua), where they took refuge. Not until 12 years later did the Spaniards successfully reconquer the area.

The viceroy repopulated the town of Santa Fe with 300 Spanish and mestizo families, giving it the title of city (ciudad), the highest title for a settlement. In 1681 he sent a force of cavalry to Nueva Vizcaya, New Spain to pursue the rebel Indians, but they refused to give battle. He also enlarged the garrisons of the region.

=== Otondo expedition ===
In 1681 Tomas de la Cerda Enrique de Lara sent another expedition to California, this one under the command of Captain Isidro Dotson. The expedition was charged with conquering the Indians and colonizing the territory. They explored the coast of Baja California as far as La Paz, and then returned to port in Navidad, Jalisco. In this expedition were three Jesuit missionaries, among them Father Eusebio Kino, from southern Germany, and later famous as a missionary, explorer and colonizer of Baja California, Sonora and Arizona. Kino had just arrived in New Spain, on 3 May 1681, was briefly friendly with Don Carlos de Sigüenza y Góngora when he arrived in the capital, but published a scathing dismissal on religious grounds of Sigüenza's scientific views on the comet of 1680. Sigüenza's publication was dedicated to the wife of the viceroy, the Marchioness of La Laguna. Kino's rejection of Sigüenza's views were dedicated to the viceroy himself. Kino had come to New Spain as a missionary. Like the previous expeditions, this one was unsuccessful. It lasted three years and cost 225,000 pesos.

=== Capture of Veracruz ===
On 17 May 1683 the pirate Lorencillo with 800 men attacked Veracruz. Insufficiently garrisoned, the port fell. The inhabitants were shut up in the churches while the pirates sacked the city. They held it from 17 May to 23 May 1683. When Spanish forces arrived at Veracruz to do battle, the pirates quickly took to the sea. They left with enormous quantities of merchandise and 1,500 hostages. The booty was subsequently estimated at 7 million pesos. After leaving Veracruz, the pirates went on to attack Campeche and Yucatán.

=== El tapado ===
On 22 May 1683, Antonio Benavides, marques de San Vicente disembarked at Veracruz. Better known subsequently as the impostor El Tapado, he claimed to be visitador general (royal inspector) and governor of New Spain appointed by Queen Regent Mariana of Austria. He was arrested at Cuetlaxcoapa (Puebla), accused of being one of Lorencillo's pirates. From there he was taken to Mexico City in chains. On 12 July 1684 he was conducted to the scaffold, but when he appeared there was an eclipse of the sun. Although the people viewed this as Heaven's displeasure at the execution of an innocent, he was executed anyway.

== Later life ==
Viceroy's de la Cerda's term was extended three years by king Charles II. On 16 November 1686 he turned over authority to his successor, Melchor Portocarrero, 3rd Count of Monclova. The viceroy and his wife, María Luisa Manrique de Lara y Gonzaga, had a friendly relationship with the great Mexican poet Sor Juana Inés de la Cruz.

In 1689 in Spain he became a member of the Council of the Indies and a Grandee of Spain. Later he was majordomo (head steward) to queen Mariana of Austria. He died on 22 April 1692 in Madrid.

== Additional information ==
=== Sources ===
- Cerda Manrique de Lara, Tomás Antonio de la. Enciclopedia de México (in Spanish). Vol. 3. Mexico City. 1996. ISBN 1-56409-016-7.
- García Purón, Manuel (1984). México y sus gobernantes (in Spanish). Vol. 1. Mexico City: Joaquín Porrua.
- Orozco Linares, Fernando (1985). Gobernantes de México (in Spanish). Mexico City: Panorama Editorial. ISBN 968-38-0260-5.
- Orozco Linares, Fernando (1988). Fechas Históricas de México (in Spanish). Mexico City: Panorama Editorial. ISBN 968-38-0046-7.
- Hobbs, Nicolas (2007). "Grandes de España" (in Spanish).

=== References ===
Government offices
Preceded by Payo; Enríquez de Rivera	Viceroy of New Spain; 1680–1686	Succeeded by The Count of Monclova
Spanish nobility
Preceded by Antonio de la Cerda	Marquess of Laguna de Camero Viejo; 1671–1692	Succeeded by José María de la Cerda
