= Church of La Compañía, Puebla =

Church in Puebla, Mexico

Church of La Compañía
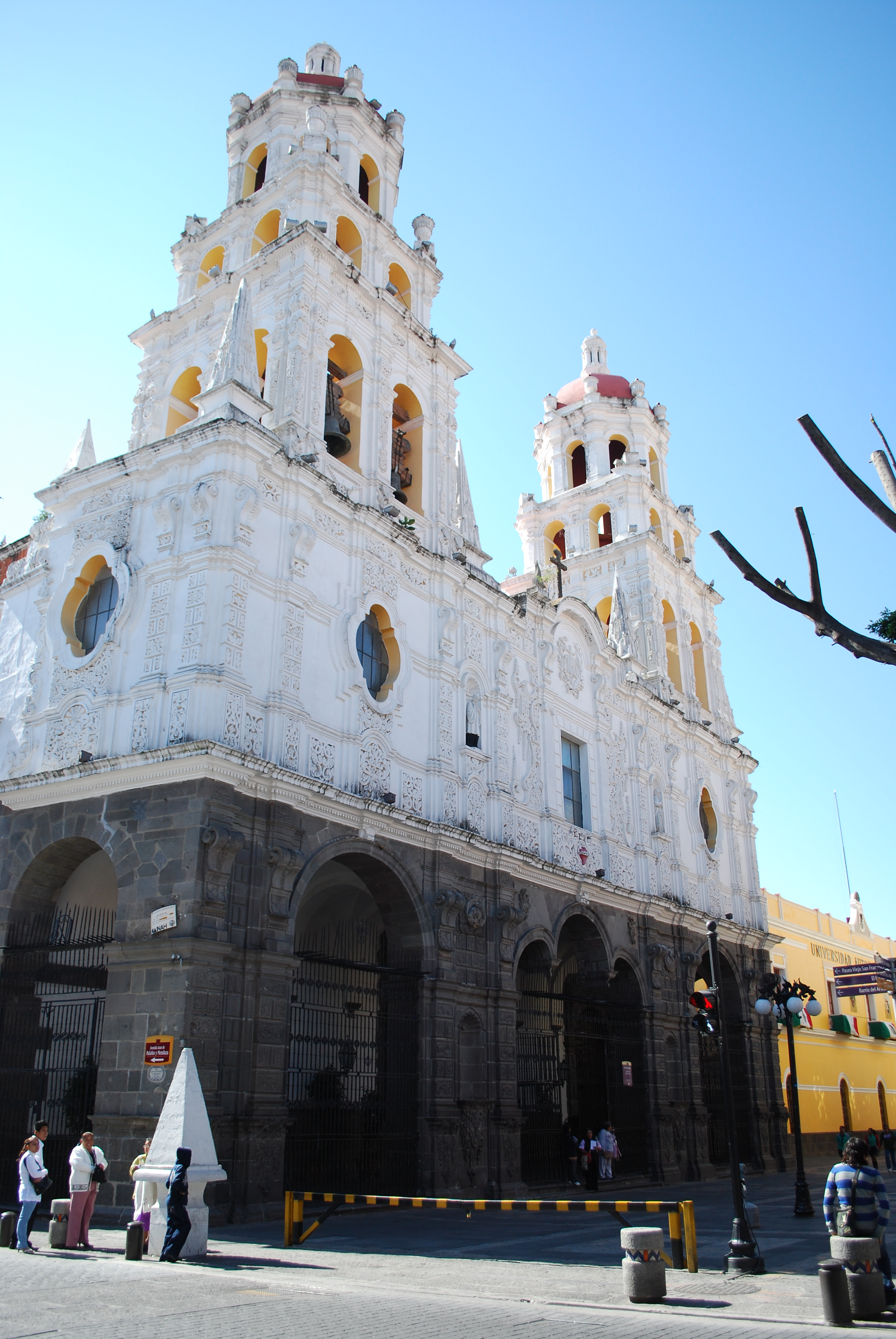
- The church's exterior in 2013

- Location within Mexico

Location
- Interactive map of Church of La Compañía
- Coordinates: 19°2′33.5″N 98°11′44″W

The Church of La Compañía (Spanish: Templo de la Compañía) is a church in the city of Puebla's historic centre, in the Mexican state of Puebla.

== See also ==
- List of buildings in Puebla City
- List of Jesuit sites
