= Felipe Pereda =

Spanish art historian

- Born: Felipe Pereda Espeso; Madrid, Spain
- Citizenship: Spanish-American
- Title: Fernando Zóbel de Ayala Professor of Spanish Art and Director of Graduate Studies
- Awards: Winner of the 2025 Sheila ffolliott Prize for the Best Book in Art History from The Sixteenth Century Society

Academic background
- Education: Complutense University of Madrid; UNED; Autonomous University of Madrid
- Thesis: El artista, la imagen, y su público en Salamanca, 1520-1525 (1996)
- Doctoral advisor: Alfonso Rodríguez G. de Ceballos

Academic work
- Discipline: Art history
- Sub-discipline: Spanish art; Early modern art; Image theory
- Institutions: Autonomous University of Madrid; Johns Hopkins University; Harvard University

Felipe Pereda is a Spanish art historian and academic. He is the Fernando Zóbel de Ayala Professor of Spanish Art and Director of Graduate Studies at the Department of History of Art and Architecture at Harvard University. Pereda is president of the Society for Iberian Global Art (SIGA).

== Early life and education ==
Pereda was born in Madrid. He studied art history at the Universidad Complutense, where he received his Licenciatura in Geography and History in 1988. He also studied philosophy at the National University of Distance Education (UNED). He then attended the Autonomous University of Madrid, receiving his PhD in 1997.

== Career and research ==
Pereda began his academic career at the Autonomous University of Madrid, where he served as assistant professor (1997–2002) and later as associate professor of art history (2002–2011). He then moved to the United States and joined Johns Hopkins University as the Nancy H. and Robert E. Hall Professor of the Humanities in the Department of the History of Art (2011–2015). In 2015, he was appointed Fernando Zóbel de Ayala Professor of Spanish Art at Harvard University, where he also serves as director of graduate studies.

He has held visiting positions at the Instituto de Investigaciones Estéticas at the National Autonomous University of Mexico, the Center for Advanced Study in the Visual Arts (CASVA) at the National Gallery of Art in Washington, D.C., Villa I Tatti (The Harvard University Center for Italian Renaissance Studies). Pereda has been a visiting professor at the Scuola Normale Superiore (Pisa) and the CY Advanced Studies (CY Cergy Paris Université).

His work focuses on Spanish art in the early modern period (15th–18th centuries), with particular emphasis on the process of religious confessionalization of its visual culture. His work also spanned art theory, image theory, and the history of architecture. He published on artists including Pietro Torrigiano, Sebastiano del Piombo, Luis de Morales, Jusepe de Ribera, Francisco de Zurbarán, Velázquez, El Greco, and, most recently, Francisco de Goya. Pereda has been researching the work of Goya and his relationship to late 18th-century debates on women's rights.

== Selected publications ==
=== Books ===
- El atlas del Rey Planeta. La descripción de España y de las costas y puertos de sus reinos (with Fernando Marías, 2002; 3rd edition 2003)
- Images of Discord: Poetics and Politics of the Sacred Image in 15th Century Spain (Harvey Miller, 2018)
- Crime and Illusion: The Art of Truth in the Spanish Golden Age (Brepols-Harvey Miller, 2018)
- The Man Who Broke Michelangelo's Nose (Penn State University Press, 2024; Spanish translation, Madrid, UCM, 2024)
- Felipe Pereda/Paul Sachs, Tales of an Epoch. The Origins of Art Education in America (Tide Pool Press, Boston, 2025)

=== Curated exhibitions and catalogues ===
- Zóbel. El futuro del pasado, Madrid, Museo del Prado, 2022 (with Manuel Fontán)
- Zóbel. The Future of the Past. The Routes of a Cosmopolitan, Ayala Museum: Manila (Makati City), 2024 (with Manuel Fontán)
- Fernando Zóbel. Order is Essential, National Gallery Singapore, 2025 (with Patrick Flores, Clarissa Chikiamco and Manuel Fontán).

=== Selected articles ===
- "Le origini dell'architettura cubica: Alfonso de Madrigal, Nicola da Lira e la querelle salomonista nella Spagna del Quattrocento." Annali di architettura (2005)
- "The Shelter of the Savage. The Forest Façade of the San Gregorio Colegio, from Castile to the New World", in Medieval Encounters (2010)
- "The Oblivious Memory of Images: The ‘Burial of the Count of Orgaz and the Medieval afterlife of the Ancient Lament," Codex Aquilarensis (2018)
- "‘Twin Brothers’: Mimesis as Providence in Viceregal Perú." RES. Anthropology and Aesthetics (2019)
- "Vox populi: Carnal blood, spiritual milk, and the debate surrounding the Immaculate conception, ca. 1600." Medieval Encounters (2018)
- "’Consumed by Either Fire or Fire:’ Venus in the Mirror of Velázquez," I Tatti Studies (2023)
- "Goya, Portraiture, and the (Impossible) Art of Deciphering Faces," Journal of Medieval and Early Modern Studies (2023)
