= Paredes de Nava =

- municipality
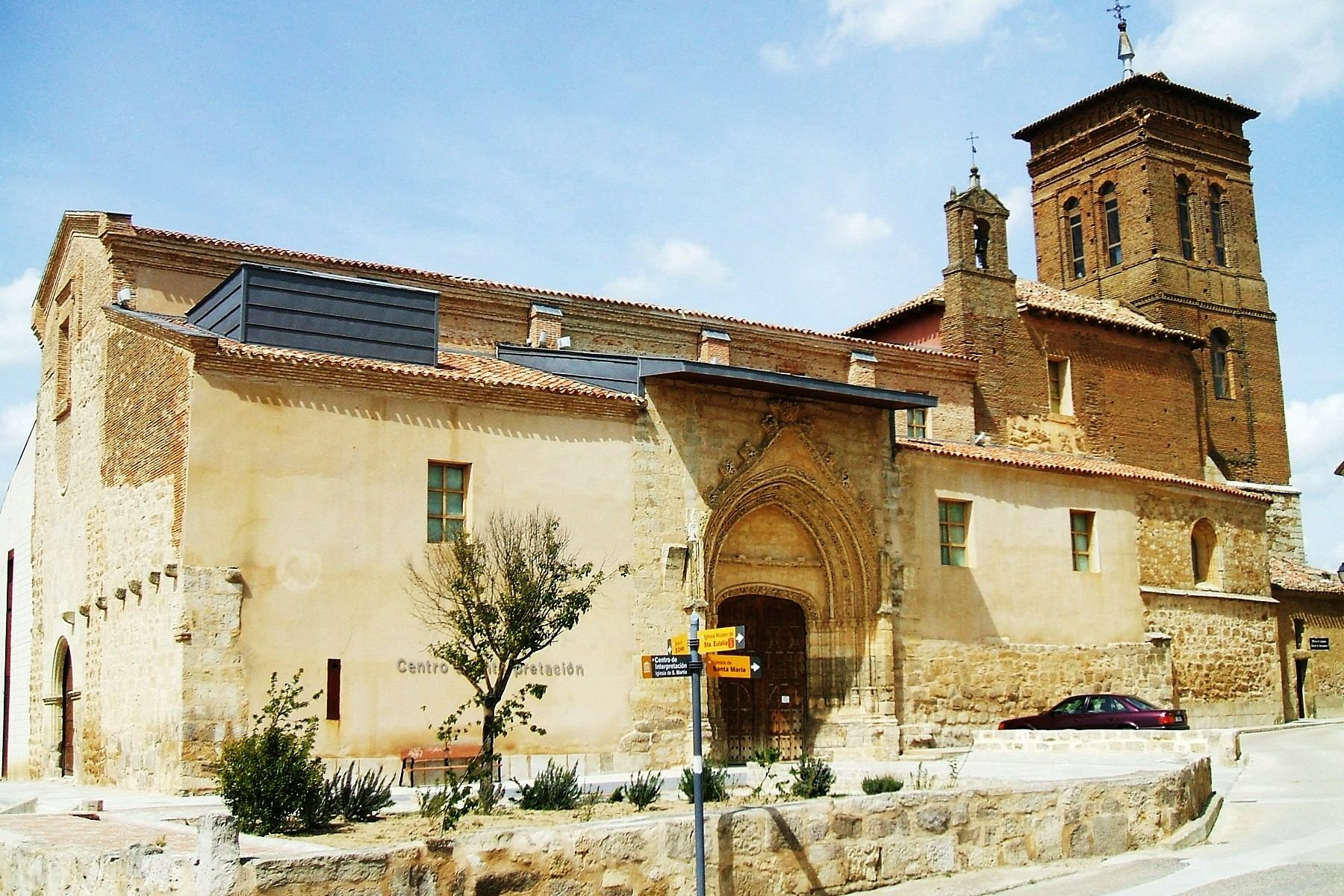
- Church of Saint Martin

- Flag Coat of arms

- Location in Spain.
- Coordinates: 42°09′10″N 4°41′40″W
- Country: Spain
- Autonomous community: Castile and León
- Province: Palencia
- Comarca: Tierra de Campos

Government
  - Mayor: Luis Calderón Nájera (PP)

Area
  - Total: 129 km^{2} (50 sq mi)
- Elevation: 775 m (2,543 ft)

Population (2025-01-01)
  - Total: 1,927
  - Density: 14.9/km^{2} (38.7/sq mi)
- Demonym: Paredeños
- Time zone: UTC+1 (CET)
  - Summer (DST): UTC+2 (CEST)
- Website: Official website

Paredes de Nava is a municipality located in the province of Palencia, Castile and León, Spain.

It is the birthplace of Renaissance painter Pedro Berruguete. Some paintings by him can be seen in the predella of the local church of Santa Eulalia. Other sights include the church of St. Martin (15th century, renovated in the 18th century).

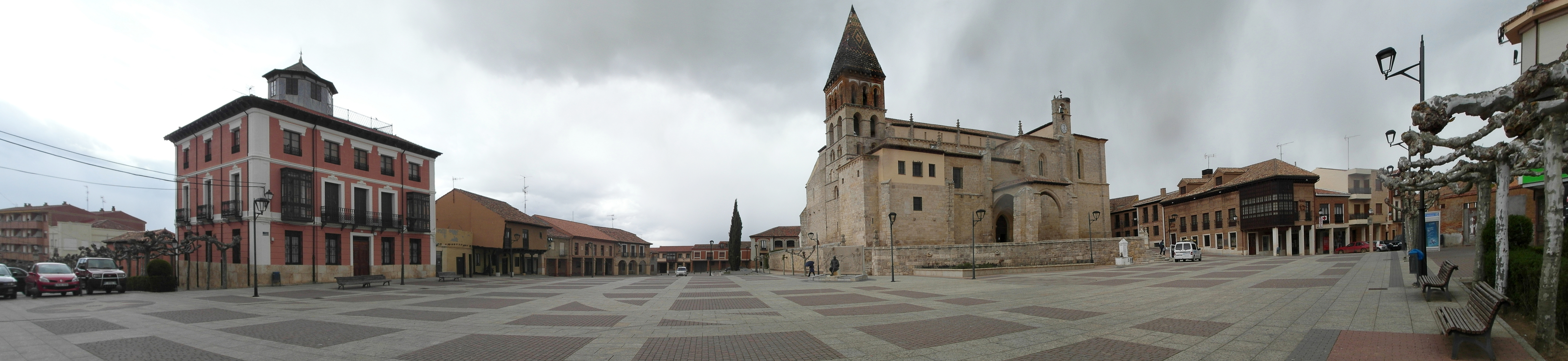
Plaza de España

== Festivities ==
- San Sebastián. (January 20)
- Virgen de Carejas. (September 8)
- Fiestas del Señor o Benditos Novillos (Sunday, Monday and Tuesday after September 8)

== Main sights ==
=== Santa Eulalia's church ===
The church of Santa Eulalia was built throughout the 12th and 16th centuries, and was declared National Monument in 1962. On September 13 of 1964, the first parochial museum of sacred art founded in Spain was inaugurated, and nowadays there are two activities: religious celebrations and the exhibition of sacred art.

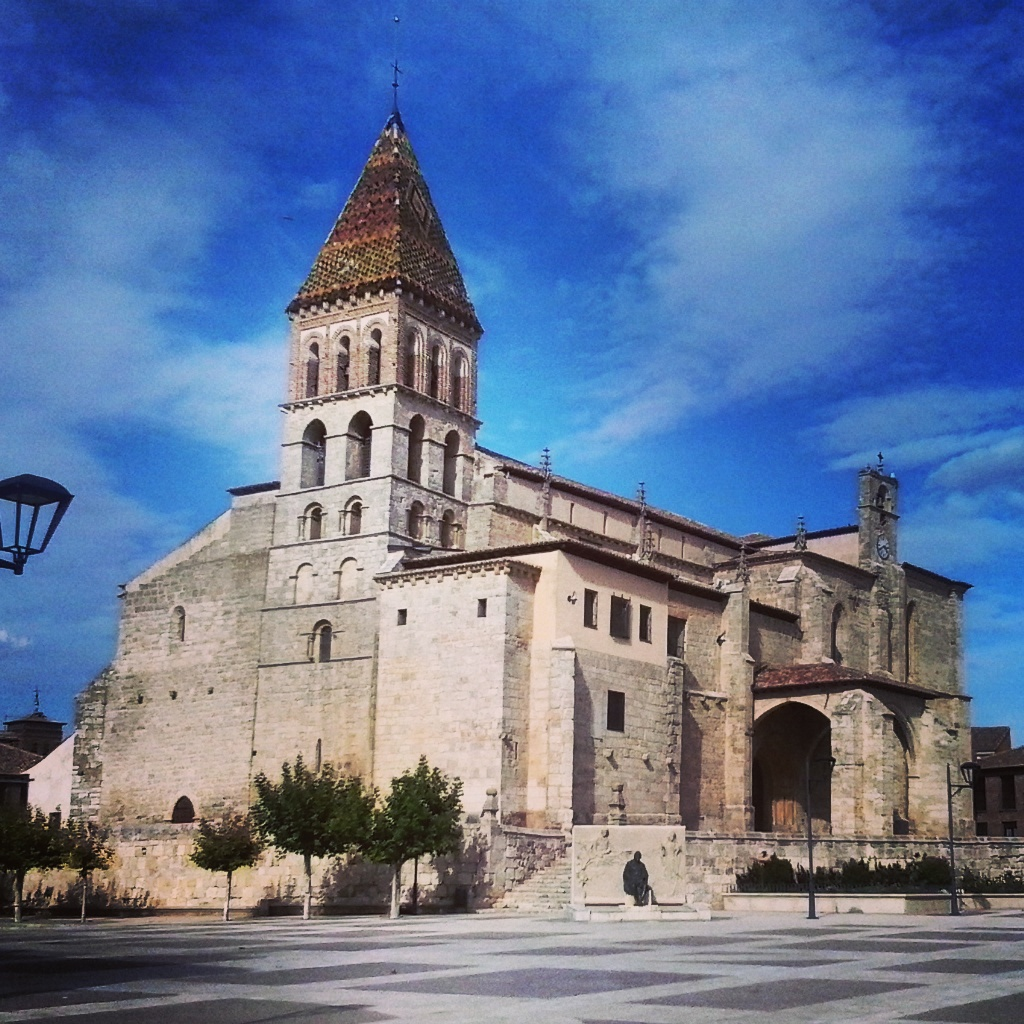
Church of Santa Eulalia

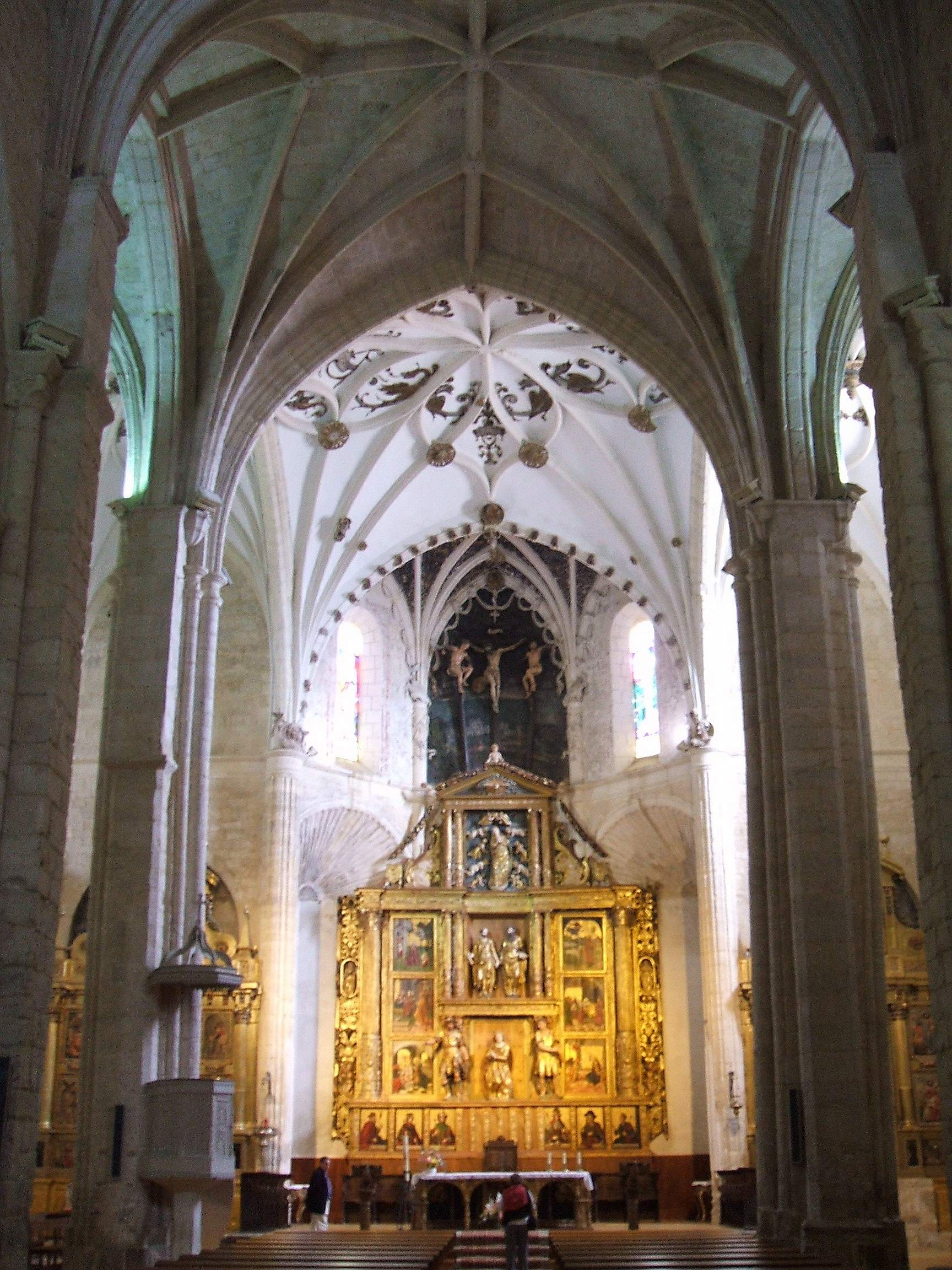
Church of Santa Eulalia, interior

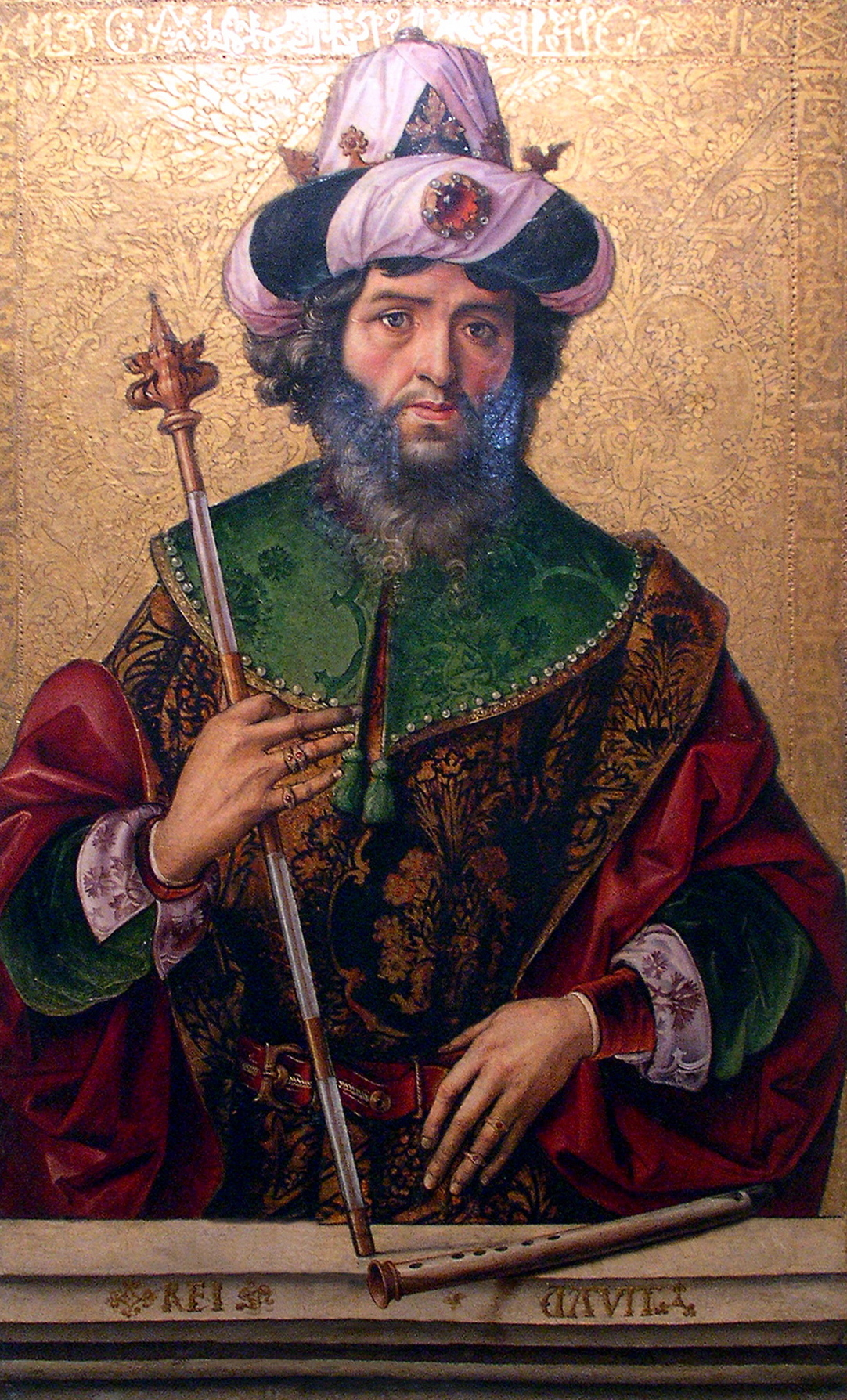
Painting of King David, in the Church of Santa Eulalia

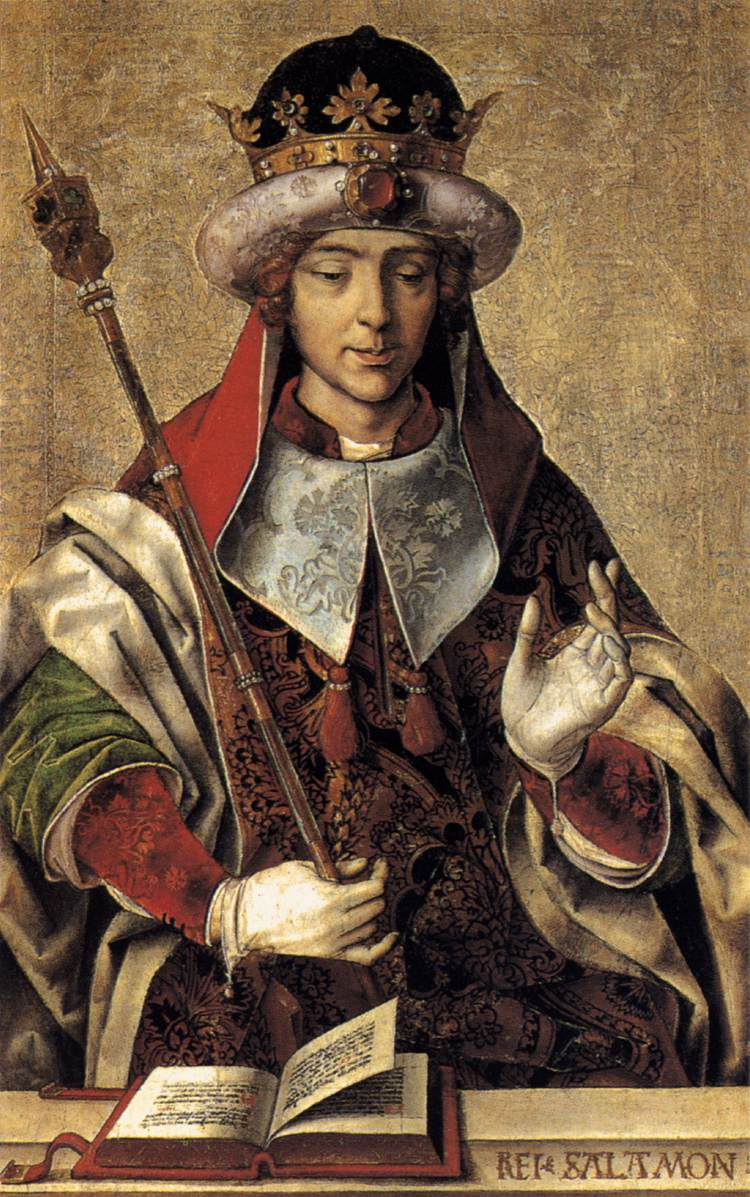
Painting of King Solomon, in the Church of Santa Eulalia

=== Church of San Martín ===
It was built in the 15th century, but extensively renovated in the 17th century. At present it hosts the Interpretation Center of Tierra de Campos and the tourism office of Paredes de Nava.

== People ==
- Jorge Manrique (1440 – 1479) – Poet, writer of the “Coplas a la muerte de su padre”.
- Pedro Berruguete (1450 – 1504) – Painter.
- Alonso Berruguete (1488 – 1561) – Painter, sculptor and architect.
- Felipe Berrojo - Architect, sculptor and plasterer (1628-1694).
- Gregoria Matorras (1738 – 1813) – Mother of José de San Martín, military rioplatense.
- Antonio Vallejo-Nájera (1889 - 1960) - Psychiatrist, physician and eugenicist.
- Tomás Teresa León (1924 - 1962) - Priest and official writer of Paredes de Nava.

== Twin towns ==
- Plaisance, France
