= Palacio del Marqués de Malpica =

Building in Toledo Province, Spain

Coordinates: 39.8602°N 4.0256°W

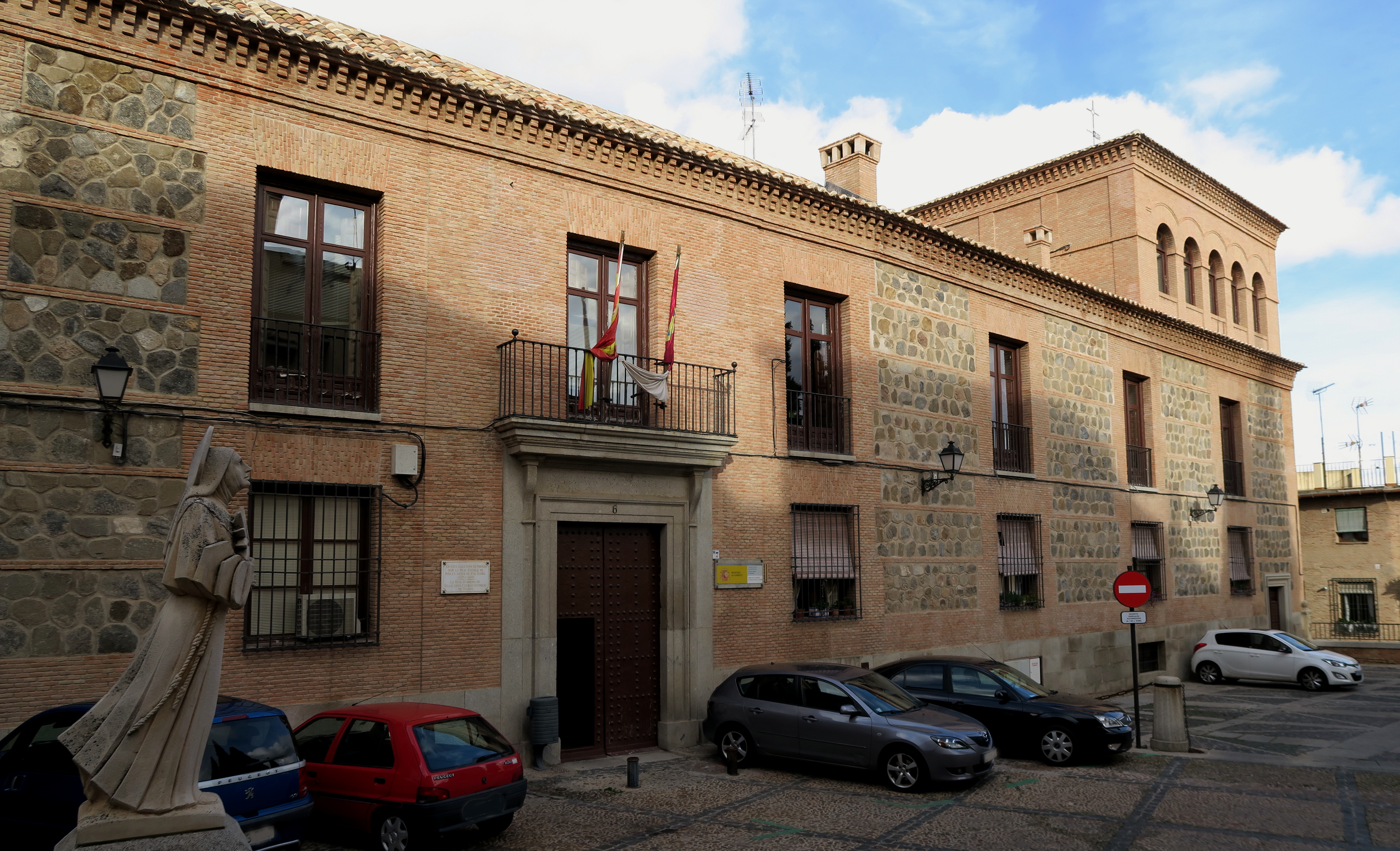
Palacio del Marqués de Malpica

The Palacio del Marqués de Malpica (Palace of the Marquis of Malpica) is a building in the city of Toledo, Castile-La Mancha, Spain. It's located at the Plaza de Santa Clara and next to the monastery of the same name. It is of Renaissance style and belonged to the Marquis of Malpica y Valdepusa.

== Description ==
The facade, although it has undergone transformations, conserves the tower-lookout, so usual in the typology of the Toledan house. The basements, of enormous dimensions, maintain their vaults. In the interior has a square courtyard, with four columns on each side and two floors, both of Ionic order, which are lintelled with zapatas and stone lintels.

The lower floor has the zapatas decorated with a pinkish tone, and the entablature alternates this decoration with the family's shields. The corner solution is made with a column that has the zapata bent towards both sides.

On the upper floor, the columns rest on rectangular pedestals, without which the balusters that formed the parapet can be seen. Architecturally we find the same reasons, changing only the decoration; the zapatas have insignia and where before we saw the familiar shields now appear the classic Alonso de Covarrubias' heads. The final cornice is formed by strong corbels, which alternate with four-leaf flowers.

To the left of the courtyard there is a large cloister staircase, which is not in direct contact with the courtyard, since it is surrounded by a crujía (architectural space between two load-bearing walls) that still retains, in some places, some columns holding a lintel, decorated with the same rosettes that of the courtyard, and a small stone cornice, in the upper part of the wall, that tells us how the size of the old crujías corresponds to the current one.

The courtyard of this building, although not documented, must have been built by Alonso de Covarrubias, due to the similarity with other works of him, and its execution can be dated towards the end-1530s.

In front of the tower-lookout has been enabled today the corresponding car parking of a ministerial institution, using the site of the former stables of the Marquis of Malpica, whose remains were demolished, around 1960.

== In art ==
This building appears in the drawing of Toledo of 1563 by Anton van den Wyngaerde naming the building with the name of Don Francisco de Ribera, then its owner. Also, fifty years later, El Greco in his View and Plan of Toledo shows this house-palace.
